Asteraceae or Compositae is a family of flowering plants (anthophytes) in the order Asterales. Asteraceae (commonly referred to as the aster, daisy, composite, or sunflower family), is a very large and widespread family, which includes over 32,000 currently accepted species, in over 1,900 genera (list) in 13 subfamilies. In terms of numbers of species, the Asteraceae are rivaled only by the Orchidaceae. Nearly all Asteraceae bear their flowers in dense heads (capitula or pseudanthia) surrounded by involucral bracts. When viewed from a distance, each capitulum may appear to be a single flower. Enlarged outer (peripheral) flowers in the capitula may resemble petals, and the involucral bracts may look like a calyx. The name Asteraceae comes from the type genus Aster, from the Ancient Greek , meaning star, and refers to the star-like form of the inflorescence. The alternative name Compositae is still valid under the International Code of Nomenclature for algae, fungi, and plants. It refers to the "composite" nature of the capitula, which consist of a few or many individual flowers.

Most members of Asteraceae are annual or perennial herbs, but a significant number are also shrubs, vines, or trees. The family has a cosmopolitan distribution, with species ranging from subpolar to tropical regions, colonizing a wide variety of habitats. The largest proportion of the species occur in the arid and semiarid regions of subtropical and lower temperate latitudes.

23,420 species of vascular plant have been recorded in South Africa, making it the sixth most species-rich country in the world and the most species-rich country on the African continent. Of these, 153 species are considered to be threatened. Nine biomes have been described in South Africa: Fynbos, Succulent Karoo, desert, Nama Karoo, grassland, savanna, Albany thickets, the Indian Ocean coastal belt, and forests.

The 2018 South African National Biodiversity Institute's National Biodiversity Assessment plant checklist lists 35,130 taxa in the phyla Anthocerotophyta (hornworts (6)), Anthophyta (flowering plants (33534)), Bryophyta (mosses (685)), Cycadophyta (cycads (42)), Lycopodiophyta (Lycophytes(45)), Marchantiophyta (liverworts (376)), Pinophyta (conifers (33)), and Pteridophyta (cryptogams (408)).

329 genera are represented in the literature. Listed taxa include species, subspecies, varieties, and forms as recorded, some of which have subsequently been allocated to other taxa as synonyms, in which cases the accepted taxon is appended to the listing. Multiple entries under alternative names reflect taxonomic revision over time.

Acanthospermum 
Genus Acanthospermum:
 Acanthospermum australe (Loefl.) Kuntze, not indigenous
 Acanthospermum glabratum (DC.) Wild, not indigenous
 Acanthospermum hispidum DC. not indigenous

Acanthotheca 
Genus Acanthotheca:
 Acanthotheca pinnatisecta DC. accepted as Dimorphotheca pinnata (Thunb.) Harv.

Achillea 
Genus Achillea:
 Achillea millefolium L. not indigenous

Achyrocline 
Genus Achyrocline:
 Achyrocline stenoptera (DC.) Hilliard & B.L.Burtt, accepted as Helichrysum stenopterum DC. indigenous

Acmella 
Genus Acmella:
 Acmella caulirhiza Delile, not indigenous, invasive
 Acmella decumbens (Sm.) R.K.Jansen, not indigenous, invasive

Adenachaena 
Genus Adenachaena:
 Adenachaena leptophylla DC. accepted as Phymaspermum leptophyllum (DC.) Benth. & Hook. ex B.D.Jacks. indigenous
 Adenachaena parvifolia DC. accepted as Phymaspermum parvifolium (DC.) Benth. & Hook. ex B.D.Jacks. endemic
 Adenachaena pubescens DC. accepted as Phymaspermum parvifolium (DC.) Benth. & Hook. ex B.D.Jacks. indigenous

Adenanthellum 
Genus Adenanthellum:
 Adenanthellum osmitoides (Harv.) B.Nord. indigenous

Adenoglossa 
Genus Adenoglossa:
 Adenoglossa decurrens (Hutch.) B.Nord. endemic

Adenostemma 
Genus Adenostemma:
 Adenostemma caffrum DC. indigenous
 Adenostemma viscosum J.R.Forst. & G.Forst. indigenous

Afroaster 
Genus Afroaster:
 Afroaster bowiei (Harv.) J.C.Manning & Goldblatt, endemic
 Afroaster comptonii (Lippert) J.C.Manning & Goldblatt, indigenous
 Afroaster confertifolius (Hilliard & B.L.Burtt) J.C.Manning & Goldblatt, endemic
 Afroaster erucifolius (Thell.) J.C.Manning & Goldblatt, indigenous
 Afroaster laevigatus (Sond.) J.C.Manning & Goldblatt, endemic
 Afroaster lydenburgensis (Lippert) J.C.Manning & Goldblatt, indigenous
 Afroaster nubimontis (Lippert) J.C.Manning & Goldblatt, endemic
 Afroaster peglerae (Bolus) J.C.Manning & Goldblatt, endemic
 Afroaster perfoliatus (Oliv.) J.C.Manning & Goldblatt, indigenous
 Afroaster pleiocephalus (Harv.) J.C.Manning & Goldblatt, endemic
 Afroaster serrulatus (Harv.) J.C.Manning & Goldblatt, indigenous
 Afroaster zuluensis (Lippert) J.C.Manning & Goldblatt, endemic

Ageratina 
Genus Ageratina:
 Ageratina adenophora (Spreng.) R.M.King & H.Rob. not indigenous, invasive
 Ageratina altissima (L.) R.M.King & H.Rob. not indigenous
 Ageratina riparia (Regel) R.M.King & H.Rob. not indigenous, invasive

Ageratum 
Genus Ageratum:
 Ageratum conyzoides L. not indigenous, invasive
 Ageratum houstonianum Mill. not indigenous, invasive

Alatoseta 
Genus Alatoseta:
 Alatoseta tenuis Compton, endemic

Alciope 
Genus Alciope:
 Alciope lanata (Thunb.) DC. accepted as Capelio tomentosa (Burm.f.) B.Nord.
 Alciope tabularis (Thunb.) DC. accepted as Capelio tabularis (Thunb.) B.Nord.

Ambrosia 
Genus Ambrosia:
 Ambrosia artemisiifolia L. not indigenous
 Ambrosia psilostachya DC. not indigenous
 Ambrosia tenuifolia Spreng. not indigenous

Amellus 
Genus Amellus:
 Amellus alternifolius Roth, indigenous
 Amellus alternifolius Roth subsp. alternifolius, endemic
 Amellus alternifolius Roth subsp. angustissimus (DC.) Rommel, endemic
 Amellus asteroides (L.) Druce, indigenous
 Amellus asteroides (L.) Druce subsp. asteroides, endemic
 Amellus asteroides (L.) Druce subsp. mollis Rommel, endemic
 Amellus capensis (Walp.) Hutch. endemic
 Amellus coilopodius DC. endemic
 Amellus epaleaceus O.Hoffm. indigenous
 Amellus flosculosus DC. indigenous
 Amellus microglossus DC. endemic
 Amellus nanus DC. indigenous
 Amellus strigosus (Thunb.) Less. indigenous
 Amellus strigosus (Thunb.) Less. subsp. pseudoscabridus Rommel, endemic
 Amellus strigosus (Thunb.) Less. subsp. scabridus (DC.) Rommel, endemic
 Amellus strigosus (Thunb.) Less. subsp. strigosus, endemic
 Amellus tenuifolius Burm. endemic
 Amellus tridactylus DC. indigenous
 Amellus tridactylus DC. subsp. arenarius (S.Moore) Rommel, indigenous
 Amellus tridactylus DC. subsp. olivaceus Rommel, endemic
 Amellus tridactylus DC. subsp. tridactylus, endemic

Amphiglossa 
Genus Amphiglossa:
 Amphiglossa callunoides DC. endemic
 Amphiglossa celans Koekemoer, endemic
 Amphiglossa corrudifolia DC. endemic
 Amphiglossa foliosa J.C.Manning & Helme, endemic
 Amphiglossa grisea Koekemoer, endemic
 Amphiglossa kolbei Bolus, accepted as Disparago kolbei (Bolus) Hutch. indigenous
 Amphiglossa nitidula DC. accepted as Amphiglossa tomentosa (Thunb.) Harv.
 Amphiglossa perotrichoides DC. endemic
 Amphiglossa rudolphii Koekemoer, endemic
 Amphiglossa susannae Koekemoer, endemic
 Amphiglossa tecta (Brusse) Koekemoer, endemic
 Amphiglossa tomentosa (Thunb.) Harv. indigenous
 Amphiglossa triflora DC. indigenous

Anaglypha 
Genus Anaglypha:
 Anaglypha acicularis Benth. accepted as Osteospermum scabrum Thunb. indigenous

Anaxeton 
Genus Anaxeton:
 Anaxeton angustifolium Lundgren, endemic
 Anaxeton arborescens (L.) Less. endemic
 Anaxeton asperum (Thunb.) DC. indigenous
 Anaxeton asperum (Thunb.) DC. subsp. asperum, endemic
 Anaxeton asperum (Thunb.) DC. subsp. pauciflorum Lundgren, endemic
 Anaxeton brevipes Lundgren, endemic
 Anaxeton ellipticum Lundgren, endemic
 Anaxeton hirsutum (Thunb.) Less. endemic
 Anaxeton laeve (Harv.) Lundgren, endemic
 Anaxeton lundgrenii B.Nord. endemic
 Anaxeton nycthemerum Less. endemic
 Anaxeton virgatum DC. endemic

Anderbergia 
Genus Anderbergia:
 Anderbergia elsiae B.Nord. endemic
 Anderbergia epaleata (Hilliard & B.L.Burtt) B.Nord. endemic
 Anderbergia fallax B.Nord. endemic
 Anderbergia rooibergensis B.Nord. endemic
 Anderbergia ustulata B.Nord. endemic
 Anderbergia vlokii (Hilliard) B.Nord. endemic

Anisochaeta 
Genus Anisochaeta:
 Anisochaeta mikanioides DC. endemic

Anisopappus 
Genus Anisopappus:
 Anisopappus junodii Hutch. endemic
 Anisopappus latifolius (S.Moore) B.L.Burtt, endemic
 Anisopappus smutsii Hutch. indigenous

Anisothrix 
Genus Anisothrix:
 Anisothrix integra (Compton) Anderb. accepted as Pentatrichia integra (Compton) Klaassen & N.G.Bergh, endemic
 Anisothrix kuntzei O.Hoffm. accepted as Pentatrichia kuntzei (O.Hoffm.) Klaassen & N.G.Bergh, endemic

Anthemis 
Genus Anthemis:
 Anthemis arvensis L. not indigenous
 Anthemis cotula L. not indigenous

Antithrixia 
Genus Antithrixia:
 Antithrixia flavicoma DC. endemic

Aphelexis 
Genus Aphelexis:
 Aphelexis ericoides (Lam.) Sweet, accepted as Dolichothrix ericoides (Lam.) Hilliard & B.L.Burtt, indigenous

Arctotheca 
Genus Arctotheca:
 Arctotheca calendula (L.) Levyns, indigenous
 Arctotheca forbesiana (DC.) K.Lewin, endemic
 Arctotheca marginata Beyers, endemic
 Arctotheca populifolia (P.J.Bergius) Norl. indigenous
 Arctotheca prostrata (Salisb.) Britten, endemic

Arctotis 
Genus Arctotis:
 Arctotis acaulis L. endemic
 Arctotis acuminata K.Lewin, endemic
 Arctotis adpressa DC. endemic
 Arctotis aenea Jacq. endemic
 Arctotis angustifolia L. endemic
 Arctotis arctotoides (L.f.) O.Hoffm. indigenous
 Arctotis argentea Thunb. endemic
 Arctotis aspera L. indigenous
 Arctotis aspera L. var. aspera, endemic
 Arctotis aspera L. var. scabra P.J.Bergius, endemic
 Arctotis auriculata Jacq. indigenous
 Arctotis bellidiastrum (S.Moore) K.Lewin, endemic
 Arctotis bellidifolia P.J.Bergius, endemic
 Arctotis bolusii (S.Moore) K.Lewin, endemic
 Arctotis campanulata DC. indigenous
 Arctotis campanulata DC. var. campanulata, endemic
 Arctotis candida Thunb. endemic
 Arctotis caudata K.Lewin, endemic
 Arctotis crispata Hutch. accepted as Arctotis revoluta Jacq. endemic
 Arctotis cuneata DC. endemic
 Arctotis cuprea Jacq. accepted as Arctotis revoluta Jacq. endemic
 Arctotis debensis R.J.Mckenzie, endemic
 Arctotis decurrens Jacq. endemic
 Arctotis diffusa Thunb. endemic
 Arctotis discolor (Less.) Beauverd, endemic
 Arctotis dregei Turcz. endemic
 Arctotis elongata Thunb. endemic
 Arctotis erosa (Harv.) Beauverd, accepted as Arctotis subacaulis (DC.) Beauverd, endemic
 Arctotis fastuosa Jacq. indigenous
 Arctotis flaccida Jacq. endemic
 Arctotis fosteri N.E.Br. accepted as Arctotis acaulis L. endemic
 Arctotis gowerae E.Phillips, accepted as Arctotis flaccida Jacq. endemic
 Arctotis graminea K.Lewin, endemic
 Arctotis gumbletonii Hook.f. endemic
 Arctotis hirsuta (Harv.) Beauverd, endemic
 Arctotis hispidula (Less.) Beauverd, endemic
 Arctotis incisa Thunb. endemic
 Arctotis laevis Thunb. accepted as Arctotis revoluta Jacq. endemic
 Arctotis lanceolata Harv. endemic
 Arctotis leiocarpa Harv. indigenous
 Arctotis leptorhiza DC. accepted as Arctotis breviscapa Thunb. endemic
 Arctotis linearis Thunb. endemic
 Arctotis macrosperma (DC.) Beauverd, accepted as Arctotis semipapposa (DC.) Beauverd, endemic
 Arctotis merxmuelleri Friedrich, accepted as Arctotis decurrens Jacq. endemic
 Arctotis microcephala (DC.) Beauverd, indigenous
 Arctotis oocephala DC. accepted as Haplocarpha oocephala (DC.) Beyers
 Arctotis perfoliata (Less.) Beauverd, endemic
 Arctotis petiolata Thunb. endemic
 Arctotis pinnatifida Thunb. endemic
 Arctotis pusilla DC. accepted as Arctotis flaccida Jacq. endemic
 Arctotis revoluta Jacq. endemic
 Arctotis rotundifolia K.Lewin, endemic
 Arctotis schlechteri K.Lewin, endemic
 Arctotis scullyi Dummer, accepted as Arctotis decurrens Jacq. endemic
 Arctotis semipapposa (DC.) Beauverd, endemic
 Arctotis sessilifolia K.Lewin, endemic
 Arctotis setosa K.Lewin, endemic
 Arctotis stephensae Hutch. accepted as Arctotis bellidifolia P.J.Bergius
 Arctotis stoechadifolia P.J.Bergius, endemic
 Arctotis subacaulis (DC.) Beauverd, indigenous
 Arctotis suffruticosa K.Lewin, endemic
 Arctotis sulcocarpa K.Lewin, endemic
 Arctotis tricolor Jacq. endemic
 Arctotis undulata Jacq. endemic
 Arctotis venidioides DC. accepted as Arctotis flaccida Jacq. endemic
 Arctotis venusta Norl. indigenous
 Arctotis virgata Jacq. endemic

Argyrocome 
Genus Argyrocome:
 Argyrocome ericoides (Lam.) Lam. accepted as Dolichothrix ericoides (Lam.) Hilliard & B.L.Burtt, indigenous

Arnica 
Genus Arnica:
 Arnica caffra L. accepted as Gerbera crocea (L.) Kuntze, indigenous
 Arnica coronopifolia L. accepted as Gerbera linnaei Cass. indigenous
 Arnica crenata Thunb. accepted as Mairia crenata (Thunb.) Nees, indigenous
 Arnica crocea L. accepted as Gerbera crocea (L.) Kuntze, endemic
 Arnica gerbera L. accepted as Gerbera linnaei Cass. indigenous
 Arnica pyrolaefolia (Lam.) Pers. accepted as Gerbera crocea (L.) Kuntze, indigenous
 Arnica pyrolaefolia (Lam.) Pers. var. crocea (L.) Pers. accepted as Gerbera crocea (L.) Kuntze, endemic
 Arnica serrata Thunb. accepted as Gerbera serrata (Thunb.) Druce, endemic
 Arnica sinuata Thunb. accepted as Gerbera sinuata (Thunb.) Spreng., endemic

Arrowsmithia 
Genus Arrowsmithia:
 Arrowsmithia styphelioides DC. endemic

Artemisia 
Genus Artemisia:
 Artemisia afra Jacq. ex Willd. indigenous
 Artemisia afra Jacq. ex Willd. var. afra, indigenous
 Artemisia maderaspatana L. accepted as Grangea maderaspatana (L.) Poir. indigenous
 Artemisia vulgaris L. not indigenous

Artemisiopsis 
Genus Artemisiopsis:
 Artemisiopsis villosa (O.Hoffm.) Schweick. indigenous

Ascaricida 
Genus Ascaricida:
 Ascaricida adoensis (Sch.Bip. ex Walp.) Steetz, accepted as Baccharoides adoensis (Sch.Bip. ex Walp.) H.Rob. indigenous
 Ascaricida mossambiquensis Steetz, accepted as Baccharoides adoensis (Sch.Bip. ex Walp.) H.Rob. indigenous
 Ascaricida richardi Steetz, accepted as Baccharoides adoensis (Sch.Bip. ex Walp.) H.Rob.

Aspilia 
Genus Aspilia:
 Aspilia mossambicensis (Oliv.) Wild, indigenous
 Aspilia natalensis (Sond.) Wild, indigenous
 Aspilia pluriseta Schweinf. indigenous
 Aspilia pluriseta Schweinf. subsp. pluriseta, indigenous

Aster 
Genus Aster:
 Aster ananthocladus Hilliard & B.L.Burtt, endemic
 Aster bakerianus Burtt Davy ex C.A.Sm. accepted as Afroaster hispidus (Thunb.) J.C.Manning & Goldblatt, indigenous
 Aster bowiei Harv. accepted as Afroaster bowiei (Harv.) J.C.Manning & Goldblatt, endemic
 Aster comptonii W.Lippert, accepted as Afroaster comptonii (Lippert) J.C.Manning & Goldblatt, indigenous
 Aster confertifolius Hilliard & B.L.Burtt, accepted as Afroaster confertifolius (Hilliard & B.L.Burtt) J.C.Manning & Goldblatt, endemic
 Aster erucifolius (Thell.) W.Lippert, accepted as Afroaster erucifolius (Thell.) J.C.Manning & Goldblatt, indigenous
 Aster harveyanus Kuntze, accepted as Afroaster serrulatus (Harv.) J.C.Manning & Goldblatt, indigenous
 Aster laevigatus (Sond.) Kuntze, accepted as Afroaster laevigatus (Sond.) J.C.Manning & Goldblatt, endemic
 Aster lydenburgensis W.Lippert, accepted as Afroaster lydenburgensis (Lippert) J.C.Manning & Goldblatt, endemic
 Aster nubimontis W.Lippert, accepted as Afroaster nubimontis (Lippert) J.C.Manning & Goldblatt, endemic
 Aster peglerae Bolus, accepted as Afroaster peglerae (Bolus) J.C.Manning & Goldblatt, endemic
 Aster perfoliatus Oliv. accepted as Afroaster perfoliatus (Oliv.) J.C.Manning & Goldblatt, indigenous
 Aster pleiocephalus (Harv.) Hutch. accepted as Afroaster pleiocephalus (Harv.) J.C.Manning & Goldblatt, endemic
 Aster pseudobakeranus W.Lippert, accepted as Afroaster pseudobakerianus (Lippert) J.C.Manning & Goldblatt
 Aster squamatus (Spreng.) Hieron. accepted as Symphyotrichum squamatum (Spreng.) G.L.Nesom, not indigenous
 Aster zuluensis W.Lippert, accepted as Afroaster zuluensis (Lippert) J.C.Manning & Goldblatt, endemic

Athanasia 
Genus Athanasia:
 Athanasia acerosa (DC.) D.Dietr. accepted as Phymaspermum acerosum (DC.) Kallersjo, indigenous
 Athanasia adenantha (Harv.) Kallersjo, endemic
 Athanasia alba Kallersjo, endemic
 Athanasia argentea R.Powell & Magee, endemic
 Athanasia bremeri Kallersjo, endemic
 Athanasia calophylla Kallersjo, endemic
 Athanasia capitata (L.) L. endemic
 Athanasia cochlearifolia Kallersjo, endemic
 Athanasia crenata (L.) L. endemic
 Athanasia crithmifolia (L.) L. indigenous
 Athanasia crithmifolia (L.) L. subsp. crithmifolia, endemic
 Athanasia crithmifolia (L.) L. subsp. palmatifida (DC.) Kallersjo, endemic
 Athanasia cuneifolia Lam. endemic
 Athanasia dentata (L.) L., endemic
 Athanasia elsiae Kallersjo, endemic
 Athanasia filiformis L.f. endemic
 Athanasia flexuosa Thunb. [1], endemic
 Athanasia grandiceps Hilliard & B.L.Burtt, endemic
 Athanasia hirsuta Thunb. endemic
 Athanasia humilis Kallersjo, endemic
 Athanasia imbricata Harv. endemic
 Athanasia inopinata (Hutch.) Kallersjo, endemic
 Athanasia juncea (DC.) D.Dietr. endemic
 Athanasia leptocephala Kallersjo, endemic
 Athanasia linifolia Burm., endemic
 Athanasia microcephala (DC.) D.Dietr. endemic
 Athanasia microphylla DC. endemic
 Athanasia minuta (L.f.) Kallersjo, indigenous
 Athanasia minuta (L.f.) Kallersjo subsp. inermis (E.Phillips) Kallersjo, endemic
 Athanasia minuta (L.f.) Kallersjo subsp. minuta, indigenous
 Athanasia natalensis Schltr. accepted as Phymaspermum acerosum (DC.) Kallersjo, indigenous
 Athanasia oocephala (DC.) Kallersjo, endemic
 Athanasia pachycephala DC. indigenous
 Athanasia pachycephala DC. subsp. eriopoda (DC.) Kallersjo, endemic
 Athanasia pachycephala DC. subsp. pachycephala, endemic
 Athanasia parviflora L. accepted as Hymenolepis crithmifolia (L.) Greuter, M.V.Agab. & Wagenitz, indigenous
 Athanasia pectinata L.f. endemic
 Athanasia pinnata L.f. endemic
 Athanasia pinnatifida (Oliv.) Hilliard, accepted as Phymaspermum pinnatifidum (Oliv.) Kallersjo, indigenous
 Athanasia pubescens (L.) L. endemic
 Athanasia quinquedentata Thunb. indigenous
 Athanasia quinquedentata Thunb. subsp. quinquedentata, endemic
 Athanasia quinquedentata Thunb. subsp. rigens Kallersjo, endemic
 Athanasia rugulosa E.Mey. ex DC. endemic
 Athanasia scabra Thunb. endemic
 Athanasia sertulifera DC. endemic
 Athanasia spathulata (DC.) D.Dietr. endemic
 Athanasia tomentosa Thunb. endemic
 Athanasia trifurcata (L.) L. endemic
 Athanasia vestita (Thunb.) Druce, endemic
 Athanasia villosa Hilliard, accepted as Phymaspermum acerosum (DC.) Kallersjo, indigenous
 Athanasia virgata Jacq. endemic
 Athanasia viridis Kallersjo, endemic
 Athanasia woodii (Thell.) Hilliard, accepted as Phymaspermum woodii (Thell.) Kallersjo, indigenous

Athrixia 
Genus Athrixia:
 Athrixia angustissima DC. indigenous
 Athrixia arachnoidea J.M.Wood & M.S.Evans ex J.M.Wood, endemic
 Athrixia capensis Ker Gawl. endemic
 Athrixia crinita (L.) Druce, endemic
 Athrixia elata Sond. indigenous
 Athrixia fontana MacOwan, indigenous
 Athrixia gerrardii Harv. endemic
 Athrixia heterophylla (Thunb.) Less. indigenous
 Athrixia heterophylla (Thunb.) Less. subsp. heterophylla, endemic
 Athrixia heterophylla (Thunb.) Less. subsp. sessilifolia (DC.) Kroner, endemic
 Athrixia phylicoides DC. indigenous

Atractylis 
Genus Atractylis:
 Atractylis ciliaris L. accepted as Cullumia reticulata (L.) Greuter, M.V.Agab. & Wagenitz, indigenous

Atrichantha 
Genus Atrichantha:
 Atrichantha gemmifera (Bolus) Hilliard & B.L.Burtt, endemic

Baccharis 
Genus Baccharis:
 Baccharis aegyptiaca (L.) Desf. accepted as Conyza aegyptiaca (L.) Aiton, indigenous
 Baccharis ilicifolia Lam. accepted as Brachylaena ilicifolia (Lam.) E.Phillips & Schweick. indigenous
 Baccharis ovalis Pers. accepted as Pluchea ovalis (Pers.) DC.
 Baccharis pingraea DC. not indigenous
 Baccharis ulmifolia Burm.f. accepted as Conyza ulmifolia (Burm.f.) Kuntze, indigenous

Baccharoides 
Genus Baccharoides:
 Baccharoides adoensis (Sch.Bip. ex Walp.) H.Rob. indigenous
 Baccharoides adoensis (Sch.Bip. ex Walp.) H.Rob. var. kotschyana (Sch.Bip. ex Walp.) Isawumi, El-Gha, accepted as Baccharoides adoensis (Sch.Bip. ex Walp.) H.Rob. indigenous
 Baccharoides adoensis (Sch.Bip. ex Walp.) H.Rob. var. mossambiquensis (Steetz) Isawumi, El-Ghazaly &, accepted as Baccharoides adoensis (Sch.Bip. ex Walp.) H.Rob. indigenous

Berkheya 
Genus Berkheya:
 Berkheya acanthopoda (DC.) Roessler, endemic
 Berkheya angusta Schltr. endemic
 Berkheya angustifolia (Houtt.) Merr. indigenous
 Berkheya annectens Harv. indigenous
 Berkheya armata (Vahl) Druce, endemic
 Berkheya barbata (L.f.) Hutch. endemic
 Berkheya bergiana Soderb. endemic
 Berkheya bipinnatifida (Harv.) Roessler, indigenous
 Berkheya bipinnatifida (Harv.) Roessler subsp. bipinnatifida, endemic
 Berkheya bipinnatifida (Harv.) Roessler subsp. echinopsoides (Baker) Roessler, indigenous
 Berkheya buphthalmoides (DC.) Schltr. indigenous
 Berkheya caffra MacOwan, endemic
 Berkheya canescens DC. indigenous
 Berkheya cardopatifolia (DC.) Roessler, endemic
 Berkheya carduoides (Less.) Hutch. endemic
 Berkheya carlinifolia (DC.) Roessler, indigenous
 Berkheya carlinifolia (DC.) Roessler subsp. carlinifolia, endemic
 Berkheya carlinifolia (DC.) Roessler subsp. promontorii Roessler, endemic
 Berkheya carlinoides (Vahl) Willd. endemic
 Berkheya carlinopsis Welw. ex O.Hoffm. indigenous
 Berkheya carlinopsis Welw. ex O.Hoffm. subsp. magalismontana (Bolus) Roessler, endemic
 Berkheya chamaepeuce (S.Moore) Roessler, indigenous
 Berkheya chrysanthemoides J.C.Manning & Goldblatt, indigenous
 Berkheya ciliaris (L.) Willd. accepted as Cullumia reticulata (L.) Greuter, M.V.Agab. & Wagenitz, indigenous
 Berkheya cirsiifolia (DC.) Roessler, indigenous
 Berkheya coddii Roessler, indigenous
 Berkheya coriacea Harv. endemic
 Berkheya cruciata (Houtt.) Willd. indigenous
 Berkheya cruciata (Houtt.) Willd. subsp. cruciata, endemic
 Berkheya cruciata (Houtt.) Willd. subsp. subintegra Roessler, endemic
 Berkheya cuneata (Thunb.) Willd. endemic
 Berkheya debilis MacOwan, endemic
 Berkheya decurrens (Thunb.) Willd. endemic
 Berkheya densifolia Bohnen ex Roessler, endemic
 Berkheya discolor (DC.) O.Hoffm. & Muschl. indigenous
 Berkheya draco Roessler, endemic
 Berkheya dregei Harv. endemic
 Berkheya dumicola N.G.Bergh & Helme, indigenous
 Berkheya echinacea (Harv.) O.Hoffm. ex Burtt Davy, indigenous
 Berkheya echinacea (Harv.) O.Hoffm. ex Burtt Davy subsp. echinacea, indigenous
 Berkheya eriobasis (DC.) Roessler, endemic
 Berkheya erysithales (DC.) Roessler, indigenous
 Berkheya ferox O.Hoffm. indigenous
 Berkheya ferox O.Hoffm. var. pseudodidelta Roessler, indigenous
 Berkheya ferox O.Hoffm. var. tomentosa Roessler, indigenous
 Berkheya francisci Bolus, endemic
 Berkheya fruticosa (L.) Ehrh. endemic
 Berkheya glabrata (Thunb.) Fourc. endemic
 Berkheya griquana Hilliard & B.L.Burtt, endemic
 Berkheya herbacea (L.f.) Druce, endemic
 Berkheya heterophylla (Thunb.) O.Hoffm. indigenous
 Berkheya heterophylla (Thunb.) O.Hoffm. var. heterophylla, endemic
 Berkheya heterophylla (Thunb.) O.Hoffm. var. radiata (DC.) Roessler, endemic
 Berkheya insignis (Harv.) Thell. indigenous
 Berkheya jardineana J.C.Manning & Goldblatt, indigenous
 Berkheya latifolia J.M.Wood & M.S.Evans, indigenous
 Berkheya leucaugeta Hilliard, endemic
 Berkheya mackenii (Harv.) Roessler, endemic
 Berkheya macrocephala J.M.Wood, indigenous
 Berkheya maritima J.M.Wood & M.S.Evans, endemic
 Berkheya montana J.M.Wood & M.S.Evans, indigenous
 Berkheya multijuga (DC.) Roessler, indigenous
 Berkheya nivea N.E.Br. endemic
 Berkheya onobromoides (DC.) O.Hoffm. & Muschl. indigenous
 Berkheya onobromoides (DC.) O.Hoffm. & Muschl. var. carlinoides (Thunb.) Roessler, endemic
 Berkheya onobromoides (DC.) O.Hoffm. & Muschl. var. onobromoides, endemic
 Berkheya onopordifolia (DC.) O.Hoffm. ex Burtt Davy, indigenous
 Berkheya onopordifolia (DC.) O.Hoffm. ex Burtt Davy var. glabra Bohnen ex Roessler, indigenous
 Berkheya onopordifolia (DC.) O.Hoffm. ex Burtt Davy var. onopordifolia, indigenous
 Berkheya pannosa Hilliard, endemic
 Berkheya pauciflora Roessler, endemic
 Berkheya pinnatifida (Thunb.) Thell. indigenous
 Berkheya pinnatifida (Thunb.) Thell. subsp. ingrata (Bolus) Roessler, endemic
 Berkheya pinnatifida (Thunb.) Thell. subsp. pinnatifida, endemic
 Berkheya pinnatifida (Thunb.) Thell. subsp. stobaeoides (Harv.) Roessler, indigenous
 Berkheya purpurea (DC.) Mast. indigenous
 Berkheya radula (Harv.) De Wild. indigenous
 Berkheya radyeri Roessler, endemic
 Berkheya rhapontica (DC.) Hutch. & Burtt Davy, indigenous
 Berkheya rhapontica (DC.) Hutch. & Burtt Davy subsp. aristosa (DC.) Roessler var. aristosa, indigenous
 Berkheya rhapontica (DC.) Hutch. & Burtt Davy subsp. aristosa (DC.) Roessler var. exalata, indigenous
 Berkheya rhapontica (DC.) Hutch. & Burtt Davy subsp. platyptera (Harv.) Roessler, indigenous
 Berkheya rhapontica (DC.) Hutch. & Burtt Davy subsp. rhapontica, indigenous
 Berkheya rigida (Thunb.) Ewart, Jean White & B.Rees, endemic
 Berkheya robusta Bohnen ex Roessler, indigenous
 Berkheya rosulata Roessler, indigenous
 Berkheya seminivea Harv. & Sond. endemic
 Berkheya setifera DC. indigenous
 Berkheya speciosa (DC.) O.Hoffm. indigenous
 Berkheya speciosa (DC.) O.Hoffm. subsp. lanceolata Roessler, indigenous
 Berkheya speciosa (DC.) O.Hoffm. subsp. ovata Roessler, endemic
 Berkheya speciosa (DC.) O.Hoffm. subsp. speciosa, indigenous
 Berkheya sphaerocephala (DC.) Roessler, endemic
 Berkheya spinosa (L.f.) Druce, endemic
 Berkheya spinosissima (Thunb.) Willd. indigenous
 Berkheya spinosissima (Thunb.) Willd. subsp. namaensis Roessler var. argentifolia, indigenous
 Berkheya spinosissima (Thunb.) Willd. subsp. namaensis Roessler var. namaensis, indigenous
 Berkheya spinosissima (Thunb.) Willd. subsp. spinosissima, indigenous
 Berkheya subulata Harv. indigenous
 Berkheya subulata Harv. var. subulata, endemic
 Berkheya subulata Harv. var. wilmsiana Roessler, endemic
 Berkheya tysonii Hutch. endemic
 Berkheya umbellata DC. endemic
 Berkheya viscosa (DC.) Hutch. endemic
 Berkheya zeyheri Oliv. & Hiern, indigenous
 Berkheya zeyheri Oliv. & Hiern subsp. rehmannii (Thell.) Roessler var. rehmannii, indigenous
 Berkheya zeyheri Oliv. & Hiern subsp. rehmannii (Thell.) Roessler var. rogersiana, indigenous
 Berkheya zeyheri Oliv. & Hiern subsp. zeyheri, indigenous

Bertilia 
Genus Bertilia:
 Bertilia hantamensis (J.C.Manning & Goldblatt) Cron, endemic

Bidens 
Genus Bidens:
 Bidens bipinnata L. not indigenous
 Bidens biternata (Lour.) Merr. & Sherff, not indigenous
 Bidens formosa (Bonato) Sch.Bip. accepted as Cosmos bipinnatus Cav.
 Bidens kirkii (Oliv. & Hiern) Sherff, indigenous
 Bidens pilosa L. not indigenous
 Bidens schimperi Sch.Bip. ex Walp. indigenous
 Bidens sulphurea (Cav.) Sch.Bip. accepted as Cosmos sulphureus Cav.

Blainvillea 
Genus Blainvillea:
 Blainvillea gayana Cass. accepted as Blainvillea acmella (L.) Philipson, indigenous

Blumea 
Genus Blumea:
 Blumea cafra (DC.) O.Hoffm. accepted as Doellia cafra (DC.) Anderb.
 Blumea dregeanoides Sch.Bip. ex A.Rich. indigenous
 Blumea mollis (D.Don) Merr. accepted as Blumea dregeanoides Sch.Bip. ex A.Rich.

Bolandia 
Genus Bolandia:
 Bolandia argillacea (Cron) Cron, indigenous
 Bolandia elongata (L.f.) J.C.Manning & Cron, indigenous
 Bolandia glabrifolia (DC.) J.C.Manning & Cron, indigenous
 Bolandia pedunculosa (DC.) Cron, indigenous
 Bolandia pinnatifida (Thunb.) J.C.Manning & Cron, indigenous

Bothriocline 
Genus Bothriocline:
 Bothriocline laxa N.E.Br. indigenous

Brachylaena 
Genus Brachylaena:
 Brachylaena discolor DC. indigenous
 Brachylaena elliptica (Thunb.) DC. endemic
 Brachylaena glabra (L.f.) Druce, endemic
 Brachylaena huillensis O.Hoffm. indigenous
 Brachylaena ilicifolia (Lam.) E.Phillips & Schweick. indigenous
 Brachylaena neriifolia (L.) R.Br. endemic
 Brachylaena rotundata S.Moore, indigenous
 Brachylaena transvaalensis E.Phillips & Schweick. indigenous
 Brachylaena uniflora Harv. endemic

Brachymeris 
Genus Brachymeris:
 Brachymeris athanasioides (S.Moore) Hutch. accepted as Phymaspermum athanasioides (S.Moore) Kallersjo, indigenous
 Brachymeris bolusii Hutch. accepted as Phymaspermum athanasioides (S.Moore) Kallersjo, indigenous
 Brachymeris erubescens Hutch. accepted as Phymaspermum erubescens (Hutch.) Kallersjo, indigenous
 Brachymeris montana Hutch. accepted as Phymaspermum athanasioides (S.Moore) Kallersjo, indigenous
 Brachymeris peglerae Hutch. accepted as Phymaspermum peglerae (Hutch.) Kallersjo, indigenous
 Brachymeris scoparia DC. accepted as Phymaspermum scoparium (DC.) Kallersjo, indigenous

Brachyrhynchos 
Genus Brachyrhynchos:
 Brachyrhynchos albicaulis DC. accepted as Bolandia pinnatifida (Thunb.) J.C.Manning & Cron, indigenous
 Brachyrhynchos diversifolius DC. var. acutilobus DC. accepted as Bolandia pinnatifida (Thunb.) J.C.Manning & Cron, indigenous
 Brachyrhynchos diversifolius DC. var. cuneatus E.Mey. ex DC. accepted as Bolandia pinnatifida (Thunb.) J.C.Manning & Cron, indigenous
 Brachyrhynchos diversifolius DC. var. obtusilobus DC. accepted as Bolandia glabrifolia (DC.) J.C.Manning & Cron, indigenous
 Brachyrhynchos elongatus (L.f.) Less. accepted as Bolandia elongata (L.f.) J.C.Manning & Cron, indigenous
 Brachyrhynchos trachycarpus DC. accepted as Bolandia pinnatifida (Thunb.) J.C.Manning & Cron, indigenous
 Brachyrhynchos tuberosus DC. accepted as Senecio incertus DC. indigenous

Bryomorphe 
Genus Bryomorphe:
 Bryomorphe aretioides (Turcz.) Druce, endemic
 Bryomorphe lycopodioides (Sch.Bip. ex Walp.) Levyns, accepted as Dolichothrix ericoides (Lam.) Hilliard & B.L.Burtt, indigenous
 Bryomorphe zeyheri Harv. accepted as Bryomorphe aretioides (Turcz.) Druce, indigenous

Cacalia 
Genus Cacalia:
 Cacalia aristata (DC.) Kuntze, accepted as Hilliardiella aristata (DC.) H.Rob. indigenous
 Cacalia capensis (Houtt.) Kuntze, accepted as Hilliardiella capensis (Houtt.) H.Rob. Skvarla & V.A.Funk, indigenous
 Cacalia corymbosa (L.f.) Kuntze, accepted as Gymnanthemum corymbosum (L.f.) H.Rob. indigenous
 Cacalia cylindrica Lam. accepted as Crassothonna cylindrica (Lam.) B.Nord. indigenous
 Cacalia elaeagnoides (DC.) Kuntze, accepted as Hilliardiella elaeagnoides (DC.) Swelank. & J.C.Manning, indigenous
 Cacalia gerrardii (Harv.) Kuntze, accepted as Parapolydora gerrardii (Harv.) H.Rob. Skvarla & V.A.Funk, indigenous
 Cacalia mespilifolia (Less.) Kuntze, accepted as Gymnanthemum capensis (A.Spreng.) J.C.Manning & Swelank. indigenous
 Cacalia nudicaulis (DC.) Kuntze, accepted as Hilliardiella nudicaulis (DC.) H.Rob. endemic

Cadiscus 
Genus Cadiscus:
 Cadiscus aquaticus E.Mey. ex DC. accepted as Senecio cadiscus B.Nord. & Pelser, endemic

Calendula 
Genus Calendula:
 Calendula amplexicaulis Thunb. accepted as Osteospermum connatum DC. indigenous
 Calendula arvensis L. not indigenous
 Calendula graminifolia L. accepted as Dimorphotheca nudicaulis (L.) DC. var. graminifolia (DC.) Harv. indigenous
 Calendula monstrosa Burm.f. accepted as Osteospermum monstrosum (Burm.f.) J.C.Manning & Goldblatt, indigenous
 Calendula oppositifolia Aiton, accepted as Osteospermum oppositifolium (Aiton) Norl. indigenous
 Calendula tomentosa L.f. accepted as Osteospermum tomentosum (L.f.) Norl. endemic
 Calendula tragus Aiton, accepted as Dimorphotheca tragus (Aiton) B.Nord. endemic

Callilepis 
Genus Callilepis:
 Callilepis caerulea (Hutch.) Leins, indigenous
 Callilepis lancifolia Burtt Davy, endemic
 Callilepis laureola DC. indigenous
 Callilepis leptophylla Harv. indigenous
 Callilepis normae P.P.J.Herman & Koekemoer, indigenous
 Callilepis salicifolia Oliv. indigenous

Calostephane 
Genus Calostephane:
 Calostephane divaricata Benth. indigenous

Calotesta 
Genus Calotesta:
 Calotesta alba P.O.Karis, endemic

Campuloclinium 
Genus Campuloclinium:
 Campuloclinium macrocephalum (Less.) DC. not indigenous, invasive

Candidea 
Genus Candidea:
 Candidea stenostegia Stapf, accepted as Baccharoides adoensis (Sch.Bip. ex Walp.) H.Rob.

Capelio 
Genus Capelio:
 Capelio caledonica B.Nord. endemic
 Capelio tabularis (Thunb.) B.Nord. endemic
 Capelio tomentosa (Burm.f.) B.Nord. endemic

Caputia 
Genus Caputia:
 Caputia oribiensis (Van Jaarsv.) J.C.Manning, indigenous

Carduus 
Genus Carduus:
 Carduus macrocephalus Desf. not indigenous
 Carduus nutans L. not indigenous, invasive
 Carduus tenuiflorus Curtis, not indigenous

Carthamus 
Genus Carthamus:
 Carthamus lanatus L. not indigenous
 Carthamus reticulatus (L.) Vaill. accepted as Cullumia reticulata (L.) Greuter, M.V.Agab. & Wagenitz, indigenous

Castalis 
Genus Castalis:
 Castalis nudicaulis (L.) Norl. accepted as Dimorphotheca nudicaulis (L.) DC. indigenous
 Castalis nudicaulis (L.) Norl. var. graminifolia (L.) Norl. accepted as Dimorphotheca nudicaulis (L.) DC. var. graminifolia (DC.) Harv. indigenous
 Castalis spectabilis (Schltr.) Norl. accepted as Dimorphotheca spectabilis Schltr.
 Castalis tragus (Aiton) Norl. accepted as Dimorphotheca tragus (Aiton) B.Nord.
 Castalis tragus (Aiton) Norl. var. pinnatifida Norl. accepted as Dimorphotheca tragus (Aiton) B.Nord.

Cenia 
Genus Cenia:
 Cenia duckittiae L.Bolus, accepted as Cotula duckittiae (L.Bolus) K.Bremer & Humphries
 Cenia expansa Compton, accepted as Cotula duckittiae (L.Bolus) K.Bremer & Humphries
 Cenia microglossa DC. accepted as Cotula microglossa (DC.) O.Hoffm. & Kuntze ex Kuntze
 Cenia pectinata DC. accepted as Cotula discolor (DC.) J.C.Manning & Mucina
 Cenia sericea (L.f.) DC. accepted as Cotula sericea L.f.
 Cenia turbinata (L.) Pers. accepted as Cotula turbinata L.

Centaurea 
Genus Centaurea:
 Centaurea calcitrapa L. not indigenous
 Centaurea cyanus L. not indigenous
 Centaurea melitensis L. not indigenous
 Centaurea repens L. accepted as Rhaponticum repens (L.) Hildago, not indigenous
 Centaurea solstitialis L. not indigenous

Centipeda 
Genus Centipeda:
 Centipeda capensis Less. accepted as Dichrocephala integrifolia (L.f.) Kuntze subsp. integrifolia

Centrapalus 
Genus Centrapalus:
 Centrapalus africanus (Sond.) H.Rob. accepted as Vernonella africana Sond. indigenous

Chondrilla 
Genus Chondrilla:
 Chondrilla juncea L. not indigenous, invasive

Chromolaena 
Genus Chromolaena:
 Chromolaena odorata (L.) R.M.King & H.Rob. not indigenous, invasive

Chrysanthellum 
Genus Chrysanthellum:
 Chrysanthellum indicum DC. not indigenous

Chrysanthemoides 
Genus Chrysanthemoides:
 Chrysanthemoides incana (Burm.f.) Norl. accepted as Osteospermum incanum Burm.f. subsp. incanum, indigenous
 Chrysanthemoides monilifera (L.) Norl. accepted as Osteospermum moniliferum L.
 Chrysanthemoides monilifera (L.) Norl. subsp. canescens (DC.) Norl. accepted as Osteospermum moniliferum L. subsp. canescens (DC.) J.C.Manning & Goldblatt, indigenous
 Chrysanthemoides monilifera (L.) Norl. subsp. pisifera (L.) Norl. accepted as Osteospermum moniliferum L. subsp. pisiferum (L.) J.C.Manning & Goldblatt, endemic
 Chrysanthemoides monilifera (L.) Norl. subsp. rotundata (DC.) Norl. accepted as Osteospermum moniliferum L. subsp. rotundatum (DC.) J.C.Manning & Goldblatt, indigenous
 Chrysanthemoides monilifera (L.) Norl. subsp. septentrionalis Norl. accepted as Osteospermum moniliferum L. subsp. septentrionale (Norl.) J.C.Manning & Goldblatt, indigenous
 Chrysanthemoides monilifera (L.) Norl. subsp. subcanescens (DC.) Norl. accepted as Osteospermum incanum Burm.f. subsp. subcanescens (DC.) J.C.Manning & Goldblatt, endemic
 Chrysanthemoides pisiformis Medik. accepted as Osteospermum moniliferum L. subsp. pisiferum (L.) J.C.Manning & Goldblatt, endemic

Chrysanthemum 
Genus Chrysanthemum:
 Chrysanthemum coronarium L. accepted as Glebionis coronaria (L.) Cass. ex Spach, not indigenous
 Chrysanthemum leucanthemum L. accepted as Leucanthemum vulgare Lam. not indigenous
 Chrysanthemum segetum L. not indigenous

Chrysocoma 
Genus Chrysocoma:
 Chrysocoma acicularis Ehr.Bayer, endemic
 Chrysocoma candelabrum Ehr.Bayer, endemic
 Chrysocoma cernua L. endemic
 Chrysocoma ciliata L. indigenous
 Chrysocoma coma-aurea L. endemic
 Chrysocoma esterhuyseniae Ehr.Bayer, endemic
 Chrysocoma flava Ehr.Bayer, endemic
 Chrysocoma hantamensis J.C.Manning & Goldblatt, endemic
 Chrysocoma longifolia DC. endemic
 Chrysocoma microphylla Thunb. indigenous
 Chrysocoma mozambicensis Ehr.Bayer, indigenous
 Chrysocoma oblongifolia DC. endemic
 Chrysocoma obtusata (Thunb.) Ehr.Bayer, indigenous
 Chrysocoma puberula Merxm. indigenous
 Chrysocoma rigidula (DC.) Ehr.Bayer, endemic
 Chrysocoma schlechteri Ehr.Bayer, endemic
 Chrysocoma sparsifolia Hutch. endemic
 Chrysocoma strigosa Ehr.Bayer, endemic
 Chrysocoma tomentosa L. endemic
 Chrysocoma tridentata DC. endemic
 Chrysocoma undulata Thunb. accepted as Nidorella undulata (Thunb.) Sond. ex Harv. indigenous
 Chrysocoma valida Ehr.Bayer, endemic
 Cichorium intybus L. accepted as Cichorium intybus L. subsp. intybus, not indigenous, invasive
 Cichorium intybus L. subsp. intybus, not indigenous, invasive

Cineraria 
Genus Cineraria:
 Cineraria albicans N.E.Br. indigenous
 Cineraria albomontana Hilliard, accepted as Bolandia pedunculosa (DC.) Cron, indigenous
 Cineraria alchemilloides DC. indigenous
 Cineraria alchemilloides DC. subsp. alchemilloides, indigenous
 Cineraria angulosa Lam. endemic
 Cineraria arctotidea DC. accepted as Cineraria mollis E.Mey. ex DC. endemic
 Cineraria argillacea Cron, accepted as Bolandia argillacea (Cron) Cron
 Cineraria aspera Thunb. indigenous
 Cineraria atriplicifolia DC. endemic
 Cineraria austrotransvaalensis Cron, endemic
 Cineraria britteniae Hutch. & R.A.Dyer, accepted as Cineraria erodioides DC. var. erodioides, endemic
 Cineraria burkei Burtt Davy & Hutch. accepted as Cineraria aspera Thunb. endemic
 Cineraria cacalioides L.f. accepted as Crassothonna cacalioides (L.f.) B.Nord. endemic
 Cineraria canescens J.C.Wendl. ex Link, indigenous
 Cineraria canescens J.C.Wendl. ex Link var. canescens, indigenous
 Cineraria canescens J.C.Wendl. ex Link var. flabellifolia Harv. indigenous
 Cineraria cyanomontana Cron, endemic
 Cineraria decipiens Harv. indigenous
 Cineraria deltoidea Sond. endemic
 Cineraria dieterlenii E.Phillips, accepted as Cineraria erodioides DC. var. erodioides, indigenous
 Cineraria dregeana DC. accepted as Senecio gariepiensis Cron, endemic
 Cineraria dryogeton Cron, endemic
 Cineraria erodioides DC. indigenous
 Cineraria erodioides DC. var. erodioides, indigenous
 Cineraria erodioides DC. var. tomentosa Cron, indigenous
 Cineraria erosa (Thunb.) Harv. endemic
 Cineraria exilis DC. endemic
 Cineraria geifolia (L.) L. indigenous
 Cineraria geraniifolia DC. endemic
 Cineraria glandulosa Cron, endemic
 Cineraria grandibracteata Hilliard, endemic
 Cineraria hamiltoni S.Moore, accepted as Cineraria aspera Thunb.
 Cineraria hederifolia Cron, accepted as Senecio hederiformis Cron, endemic
 Cineraria humifusa L'Her. accepted as Cineraria angulosa Lam. endemic
 Cineraria lobata L'Her. endemic
 Cineraria lobata L'Her. subsp. lasiocaulis Cron, indigenous
 Cineraria lobata L'Her. subsp. lobata, indigenous
 Cineraria lobata L'Her. subsp. platyptera Cron, indigenous
 Cineraria lobata L'Her. subsp. soutpansbergensis Cron, indigenous
 Cineraria longipes S.Moore, endemic
 Cineraria lyrata DC. accepted as Cineraria lyratiformis Cron
 Cineraria lyratiformis Cron, indigenous
 Cineraria microglossa DC. accepted as Mesogramma apiifolium DC. endemic
 Cineraria mitellifolia L'Her. accepted as Senecio cordifolius L.f. endemic
 Cineraria mollis E.Mey. ex DC. indigenous
 Cineraria monticola Hutch. accepted as Cineraria deltoidea Sond. endemic
 Cineraria othonnites L. accepted as Crassothonna capensis (L.H.Bailey) B.Nord. indigenous
 Cineraria othonnoides Harv. endemic
 Cineraria parvifolia Burtt Davy, endemic
 Cineraria pedunculosa DC. accepted as Bolandia pedunculosa (DC.) Cron, endemic
 Cineraria pinnata O.Hoffm. ex Schinz, endemic
 Cineraria platycarpa DC. endemic
 Cineraria polycephala DC. accepted as Cineraria erodioides DC. var. erodioides, endemic
 Cineraria purpurata L. accepted as Mairia purpurata (L.) Goldblatt & J.C.Manning, indigenous
 Cineraria saxifraga DC. endemic
 Cineraria tomentosa (DC.) Less. accepted as Oresbia heterocarpa Cron & B.Nord. endemic
 Cineraria vagans Hilliard, endemic
 Cineraria vallis-pacis Dinter ex Merxm. indigenous

Cirsium 
Genus Cirsium:
 Cirsium arvense (L.) Scop. not indigenous
 Cirsium vulgare (Savi) Ten. not indigenous, invasive

Cnicus 
Genus Cnicus:
 Cnicus benedictus L. not indigenous

Comborhiza 
Genus Comborhiza:
 Comborhiza longipes (K.Bremer) Anderb. & K.Bremer, endemic
 Comborhiza virgata (N.E.Br.) Anderb. & K.Bremer, endemic

Conyza 
Genus Conyza:
 Conyza aegyptiaca (L.) Aiton, indigenous
 Conyza albida Willd. ex Spreng. accepted as Conyza sumatrensis (Retz.) E.Walker var. sumatrensis, not indigenous
 Conyza ambigua DC. accepted as Conyza bonariensis (L.) Cronquist
 Conyza arabidifolia J.Remy, accepted as Conyza chilensis Spreng.
 Conyza attenuata DC. indigenous
 Conyza bonariensis (L.) Cronquist, not indigenous
 Conyza bonariensis (L.) Cronquist forma subleiotheca Cuatrec. accepted as Conyza sumatrensis (Retz.) E.Walker var. sumatrensis
 Conyza bonariensis (L.) Cronquist var. microcephala (Cabrera) Cabrera, accepted as Conyza sumatrensis (Retz.) E.Walker var. sumatrensis
 Conyza canadensis (L.) Cronquist, not indigenous
 Conyza canescens L.f. accepted as Hilliardiella capensis (Houtt.) H.Rob. Skvarla & V.A.Funk, indigenous
 Conyza catharinensis Cabrera, accepted as Conyza chilensis Spreng.
 Conyza chilensis Spreng. not indigenous
 Conyza cinerea L. accepted as Cyanthillium cinereum (L.) H.Rob. not indigenous
 Conyza crispa (Pourr.) Rupr. accepted as Conyza bonariensis (L.) Cronquist
 Conyza floribunda Kunth var. subleiotheca (Cuatrec.) J.B.Marshall, accepted as Conyza sumatrensis (Retz.) E.Walker var. sumatrensis
 Conyza gouanii (L.) Willd. indigenous
 Conyza groegeri V.M.Badillo, accepted as Conyza sumatrensis (Retz.) E.Walker var. sumatrensis
 Conyza hispida Kunth, accepted as Conyza bonariensis (L.) Cronquist
 Conyza hochstetteri Sch.Bip. ex A.Rich. accepted as Conyza gouanii (L.) Willd. indigenous
 Conyza incisa Aiton, accepted as Conyza ulmifolia (Burm.f.) Kuntze, indigenous
 Conyza ivifolia (L.) Less. accepted as Conyza scabrida DC. indigenous
 Conyza linearis DC. accepted as Conyza bonariensis (L.) Cronquist
 Conyza linifolia (Willd.) Tackh. accepted as Conyza bonariensis (L.) Cronquist
 Conyza obscura DC. indigenous
 Conyza persicifolia (Benth.) Oliv. & Hiern, accepted as Conyza attenuata DC. indigenous
 Conyza pinifolia Lam. accepted as Hilliardiella capensis (Houtt.) H.Rob. Skvarla & V.A.Funk, indigenous
 Conyza pinnata (L.f.) Kuntze, indigenous
 Conyza pinnatifida (Thunb.) Less. endemic
 Conyza pinnatilobata DC. accepted as Conyza pinnata (L.f.) Kuntze, indigenous
 Conyza podocephala DC. indigenous
 Conyza scabrida DC. indigenous
 Conyza serratifolia Baker, accepted as Conyza attenuata DC. indigenous
 Conyza spiculosa (Hook. & Arn.) Zardini, accepted as Conyza bonariensis (L.) Cronquist
 Conyza squamata Spreng. accepted as Symphyotrichum squamatum (Spreng.) G.L.Nesom, not indigenous
 Conyza sumatrensis (Retz.) E.Walker, not indigenous
 Conyza sumatrensis (Retz.) E.Walker var. sumatrensis, not indigenous
 Conyza transvaalensis Bremek. accepted as Conyza aegyptiaca (L.) Aiton, indigenous
 Conyza ulmifolia (Burm.f.) Kuntze, indigenous
 Conyzella canadensis (L.) Rupr. accepted as Conyza canadensis (L.) Cronquist
 Conyzella linifolia (Willd.) Green, accepted as Conyza bonariensis (L.) Cronquist
 Coreopsis lanceolata L. not indigenous, invasive
 Coreopsis tinctoria Nutt. not indigenous

Corymbium 
Genus Corymbium:
 Corymbium africanum L. indigenous
 Corymbium africanum L. subsp. africanum, endemic
 Corymbium africanum L. subsp. scabridum (P.J.Bergius) Weitz var. fourcadei, endemic
 Corymbium africanum L. subsp. scabridum (P.J.Bergius) Weitz var. gramineum, endemic
 Corymbium africanum L. subsp. scabridum (P.J.Bergius) Weitz var. scabridum, endemic
 Corymbium congestum E.Mey. ex DC. endemic
 Corymbium cymosum E.Mey. ex DC. endemic
 Corymbium elsiae Weitz, endemic
 Corymbium enerve Markotter, endemic
 Corymbium glabrum L. indigenous
 Corymbium glabrum L. var. glabrum, endemic
 Corymbium glabrum L. var. rogersii (Markotter) Weitz, endemic
 Corymbium laxum Compton, indigenous
 Corymbium laxum Compton subsp. bolusii Weitz, endemic
 Corymbium laxum Compton subsp. laxum, endemic
 Corymbium theileri Markotter, endemic
 Corymbium villosum L.f. endemic

Cosmos 
Genus Cosmos:
 Cosmos bipinnatus Cav. not indigenous
 Cosmos sulphureus Cav. not indigenous

Cotula 
Genus Cotula:
 Cotula andreae (E.Phillips) K.Bremer & Humphries, endemic
 Cotula anthemoides L. indigenous
 Cotula australis (Spreng.) Hook.f. indigenous
 Cotula barbata DC. endemic
 Cotula bipinnata Thunb. endemic
 Cotula bracteolata E.Mey. ex DC. endemic
 Cotula burchellii (DC.) Hutch. accepted as Foveolina burchellii (DC.) Magee, endemic
 Cotula ceniifolia DC. endemic
 Cotula coronopifolia L. indigenous
 Cotula dielsii Muschl. endemic
 Cotula discolor (DC.) J.C.Manning & Mucina, indigenous
 Cotula duckittiae (L.Bolus) K.Bremer & Humphries, endemic
 Cotula eckloniana (DC.) Levyns, endemic
 Cotula filifolia Thunb. endemic
 Cotula heterocarpa DC. endemic
 Cotula hispida (DC.) Harv. indigenous
 Cotula latifolia Pers. accepted as Dichrocephala integrifolia (L.f.) Kuntze subsp. integrifolia
 Cotula laxa DC. endemic
 Cotula leptalea DC. endemic
 Cotula lineariloba (DC.) Hilliard, indigenous
 Cotula loganii Hutch. endemic
 Cotula macroglossa Bolus ex Schltr. endemic
 Cotula maderaspatana (L.) Willd. accepted as Grangea maderaspatana (L.) Poir. indigenous
 Cotula mariae K.Bremer & Humphries, accepted as Cotula discolor (DC.) J.C.Manning & Mucina, endemic
 Cotula melaleuca Bolus, endemic
 Cotula membranifolia Hilliard, endemic
 Cotula microglossa (DC.) O.Hoffm. & Kuntze ex Kuntze, endemic
 Cotula montana Compton, endemic
 Cotula myriophylloides Harv. endemic
 Cotula nigellifolia (DC.) K.Bremer & Humphries, indigenous
 Cotula nigellifolia (DC.) K.Bremer & Humphries var. nigellifolia, endemic
 Cotula nigellifolia (DC.) K.Bremer & Humphries var. tenuior (DC.) P.P.J.Herman, endemic
 Cotula nudicaulis Thunb. endemic
 Cotula paludosa Hilliard, indigenous
 Cotula paradoxa Schinz, endemic
 Cotula pedicellata Compton, endemic
 Cotula pedunculata (Schltr.) E.Phillips, endemic
 Cotula pterocarpa DC. endemic
 Cotula pusilla Thunb. endemic
 Cotula radicalis (Killick & Claassen) Hilliard & B.L.Burtt, indigenous
 Cotula sericea L.f. endemic
 Cotula sericea Thunb. accepted as Cotula lineariloba (DC.) Hilliard
 Cotula socialis Hilliard, indigenous
 Cotula sororia DC. endemic
 Cotula tenella E.Mey. ex DC. indigenous
 Cotula thunbergii Harv. endemic
 Cotula turbinata L. endemic
 Cotula villosa DC. endemic
 Cotula vulgaris Levyns, endemic
 Cotula zeyheri Fenzl, endemic

Crassocephalum 
Genus Crassocephalum:
 Crassocephalum crepidioides (Benth.) S.Moore, indigenous
 Crassocephalum rubens (Juss. ex Jacq.) S.Moore, indigenous
 Crassocephalum rubens (Juss. ex Jacq.) S.Moore var. rubens, indigenous
 Crassocephalum rubens (Juss. ex Jacq.) S.Moore var. sarcobasis (DC.) C.Jeffrey & Beentje, indigenous
 Crassocephalum sarcobasis (DC.) S.Moore, accepted as Crassocephalum rubens (Juss. ex Jacq.) S.Moore var. sarcobasis (DC.) C.Jeffrey & Beentje, indigenous
 Crassocephalum x picridifolium (DC.) S.Moore, indigenous

Crassothonna 
Genus Crassothonna:
 Crassothonna alba (Compton) B.Nord. endemic
 Crassothonna cacalioides (L.f.) B.Nord. endemic
 Crassothonna capensis (L.H.Bailey) B.Nord. endemic
 Crassothonna clavifolia (Marloth) B.Nord. indigenous, near endemic
 Crassothonna cylindrica (Lam.) B.Nord. indigenous
 Crassothonna discoidea (Oilv. in Hook.) B.Nord. endemic
 Crassothonna floribunda (Schltr.) B.Nord. endemic
 Crassothonna opima (Merxm.) B.Nord. indigenous, near endemic
 Crassothonna patula (Schltr.) B.Nord. endemic
 Crassothonna protecta (Dinter) B.Nord. indigenous
 Crassothonna rechingeri (B.Nord.) B.Nord. endemic
 Crassothonna sedifolia (DC.) B.Nord. indigenous
 Crassothonna sparsiflora (S.Moore) B.Nord. accepted as Crassothonna alba (Compton) B.Nord. indigenous, near endemic

Crepis 
Genus Crepis:
 Crepis capillaris (L.) Wallr. not indigenous
 Crepis hypochaeridea (DC.) Thell. not indigenous, invasive

Cullumia 
Genus Callumia:
 Cullumia aculeata (Houtt.) Roessler, indigenous
 Cullumia aculeata (Houtt.) Roessler var. aculeata, endemic
 Cullumia aculeata (Houtt.) Roessler var. sublanata (DC.) Roessler, endemic
 Cullumia bisulca (Thunb.) Less. endemic
 Cullumia carlinoides DC. endemic
 Cullumia ciliaris (L.) R.Br. accepted as Cullumia reticulata (L.) Greuter, M.V.Agab. & Wagenitz, endemic
 Cullumia ciliaris (L.) R.Br. subsp. angustifolia (Hutch.) Roessler, accepted as Cullumia reticulata (L.) Greuter, M.V.Agab. & Wagenitz, endemic
 Cullumia ciliaris (L.) R.Br. var. angustifolia Hutch. accepted as Cullumia reticulata (L.) Greuter, M.V.Agab. & Wagenitz, indigenous
 Cullumia cirsioides DC. endemic
 Cullumia decurrens Less. endemic
 Cullumia floccosa E.Mey. ex DC. endemic
 Cullumia micracantha DC. endemic
 Cullumia patula (Thunb.) Less. indigenous
 Cullumia patula (Thunb.) Less. subsp. patula, endemic
 Cullumia patula (Thunb.) Less. subsp. uncinata Roessler, endemic
 Cullumia pectinata (Thunb.) Less. endemic
 Cullumia reticulata (L.) Greuter, M.V.Agab. & Wagenitz, endemic
 Cullumia rigida DC. endemic
 Cullumia selago Roessler, endemic
 Cullumia setosa (L.) R.Br. indigenous
 Cullumia setosa (L.) R.Br. var. adnata (DC.) Harv. endemic
 Cullumia setosa (L.) R.Br. var. araneosa Roessler, endemic
 Cullumia setosa (L.) R.Br. var. microcephala Roessler, endemic
 Cullumia setosa (L.) R.Br. var. setosa, endemic
 Cullumia squarrosa (L.) R.Br. endemic
 Cullumia sulcata (Thunb.) Less. indigenous
 Cullumia sulcata (Thunb.) Less. var. intercedens Roessler, endemic
 Cullumia sulcata (Thunb.) Less. var. sulcata, endemic

Curio 
Genus Curio:
 Curio archeri (Compton) P.V.Heath, accepted as Curio arcuarii (Compton) P.V.Heath
 Curio citriformis (G.D.Rowley) P.V.Heath, endemic
 Curio crassulifolius (DC.) P.V.Heath, endemic
 Curio hallianus (G.D.Rowley) P.V.Heath, endemic
 Curio repens (L.) P.V.Heath, endemic
 Curio talinoides (DC.) P.V.Heath, endemic
 Curio talinoides (DC.) P.V.Heath var. aizoides (DC.) P.V.Heath, endemic

Cuspidia 
Genus Cuspidia:
 Cuspidia cernua (L.f.) B.L.Burtt, indigenous
 Cuspidia cernua (L.f.) B.L.Burtt subsp. annua (Less.) Roessler, endemic
 Cuspidia cernua (L.f.) B.L.Burtt subsp. cernua, endemic

Cyanthillium 
Genus Cyanthillium:
 Cyanthillium cinereum (L.) H.Rob. not indigenous
 Cyanthillium vernonioides (Muschl.) H.Rob. indigenous
 Cyanthillium wollastonii (S.Moore) H.Rob. Skvarla & V.A.Funk, indigenous

Cymbopappus 
Genus Cymbopappus:
 Cymbopappus adenosolen (Harv.) B.Nord. endemic
 Cymbopappus hilliardiae B.Nord. endemic
 Cymbopappus piliferus (Thell.) B.Nord. endemic

Cypselodontia 
Genus Cypselodontia:
 Cypselodontia eckloniana DC. accepted as Dicoma picta (Thunb.) Druce

Decaneurum 
Genus Decaneurum:
 Decaneurum amygdalinum (Delile) DC. accepted as Gymnanthemum amygdalinum (Delile) Sch.Bip. ex Walp. indigenous

Delairea 
Genus Delairea:
 Delairea odorata Lem. indigenous

Denekia 
Genus Denekia:
 Denekia capensis Thunb. indigenous

Dicerothamnus 
Genus Dicerothamnus:
 Dicerothamnus adpressus (Harv.) Koekemoer, ined. endemic
 Dicerothamnus rhinocerotis (L.f.) Koekemoer, ined. endemic

Dichrocephala 
Genus Dichrocephala:
 Dichrocephala auriculata (Thunb.) Druce, accepted as Dichrocephala integrifolia (L.f.) Kuntze subsp. integrifolia
 Dichrocephala capensis (Less.) DC. accepted as Dichrocephala integrifolia (L.f.) Kuntze subsp. integrifolia
 Dichrocephala integrifolia (L.f.) Kuntze, indigenous
 Dichrocephala integrifolia (L.f.) Kuntze subsp. integrifolia, indigenous

Dicoma 
Genus Dicoma:
 Dicoma anomala Sond. indigenous
 Dicoma anomala Sond. subsp. anomala, indigenous
 Dicoma anomala Sond. subsp. gerrardii (Harv. ex F.C.Wilson) S.Ortiz & Rodr.Oubina, indigenous
 Dicoma arenaria Bremek. indigenous
 Dicoma capensis Less. indigenous
 Dicoma fruticosa Compton, endemic
 Dicoma galpinii F.C.Wilson, indigenous
 Dicoma gerrardii Harv. ex F.C.Wilson, accepted as Dicoma anomala Sond. subsp. gerrardii (Harv. ex F.C.Wilson) S.Ortiz & Rodr.Oubina
 Dicoma kurumanii S.Ortiz & Netnou, endemic
 Dicoma macrocephala DC. indigenous
 Dicoma membranacea S.Moore, accepted as Macledium sessiliflorum (Harv.) S.Ortiz subsp. sessiliflorum var. membranaceum
 Dicoma montana Schweick. endemic
 Dicoma picta (Thunb.) Druce, endemic
 Dicoma pretoriensis C.A.Sm. accepted as Macledium pretoriense (C.A.Sm.) S.Ortiz
 Dicoma prostrata Schweick. endemic
 Dicoma relhanioides Less. accepted as Macledium relhanioides (Less.) S.Ortiz
 Dicoma schinzii O.Hoffm. indigenous
 Dicoma speciosa DC. accepted as Macledium speciosum (DC.) S.Ortiz
 Dicoma spinosa (L.) Druce, accepted as Macledium spinosum (L.) S.Ortiz
 Dicoma swazilandica S.Ortiz, Rodr.Oubina & Pulgar, indigenous
 Dicoma tomentosa Cass. indigenous
 Dicoma zeyheri Sond. accepted as Macledium zeyheri (Sond.) S.Ortiz, indigenous
 Dicoma zeyheri Sond. subsp. argyrophylla (Oliv.) G.V.Pope, accepted as Macledium zeyheri (Sond.) S.Ortiz subsp. argyrophyllum (Oliv.) S.Ortiz

Didelta 
Genus Didelta:
 Didelta carnosa (L.f.) Aiton, indigenous
 Didelta carnosa (L.f.) Aiton var. carnosa, indigenous
 Didelta carnosa (L.f.) Aiton var. tomentosa (Less.) Roessler, indigenous
 Didelta spinosa (L.f.) Aiton, indigenous

Dimorphanthes 
Genus Dimorphanthes:
 Dimorphanthes aegyptiaca (L.) Cass. accepted as Conyza aegyptiaca (L.) Aiton, indigenous

Dimorphotheca 
Genus Dimorphotheca:
 Dimorphotheca acutifolia Hutch. endemic
 Dimorphotheca barberae Harv. endemic
 Dimorphotheca caulescens Harv. indigenous
 Dimorphotheca chrysanthemifolia (Vent.) DC. endemic
 Dimorphotheca cuneata (Thunb.) Less. indigenous
 Dimorphotheca dregei DC. indigenous
 Dimorphotheca dregei DC. var. dregei, endemic
 Dimorphotheca dregei DC. var. reticulata (Norl.) B.Nord. endemic
 Dimorphotheca ecklonis DC. [1], endemic
 Dimorphotheca fruticosa (L.) Less. endemic
 Dimorphotheca graminifolia (L.) DC. accepted as Dimorphotheca nudicaulis (L.) DC. var. graminifolia (DC.) Harv. indigenous
 Dimorphotheca jucunda E.Phillips, indigenous
 Dimorphotheca montana Norl. endemic
 Dimorphotheca nudicaulis (L.) DC. indigenous
 Dimorphotheca nudicaulis (L.) DC. var. graminifolia (DC.) Harv. endemic
 Dimorphotheca nudicaulis (L.) DC. var. nudicaulis, endemic
 Dimorphotheca pinnata (Thunb.) Harv. indigenous
 Dimorphotheca pinnata (Thunb.) Harv. var. breve (Norl.) J.C.Manning, indigenous
 Dimorphotheca pinnata (Thunb.) Harv. var. pinnata, indigenous
 Dimorphotheca pluvialis (L.) Moench, indigenous
 Dimorphotheca polyptera DC. indigenous
 Dimorphotheca sinuata DC. indigenous
 Dimorphotheca spectabilis Schltr. endemic
 Dimorphotheca tragus (Aiton) B.Nord. [1], endemic
 Dimorphotheca venusta (Norl.) Norl. indigenous
 Dimorphotheca venusta (Norl.) Norl. var. amoena (Norl.) Norl. endemic
 Dimorphotheca venusta (Norl.) Norl. var. venusta, endemic
 Dimorphotheca walliana (Norl.) B.Nord. endemic
 Dimorphotheca zeyheri Sond. indigenous

Disparago 
Genus Disparago:
 Disparago anomala Schltr. ex Levyns, endemic
 Disparago barbata Koekemoer, endemic
 Disparago ericoides (P.J.Bergius) Gaertn. endemic
 Disparago gomphrenoides Sch.Bip. accepted as Elytropappus gnaphaloides (L.) Levyns
 Disparago gongylodes Koekemoer, endemic
 Disparago kolbei (Bolus) Hutch.
 Disparago kraussii Sch.Bip. endemic
 Disparago laxifolia DC. endemic
 Disparago pilosa Koekemoer, endemic
 Disparago tortilis (DC.) Sch.Bip. endemic

Distephanus 
Genus Distephanus:
 Distephanus angulifolius (DC.) H.Rob. & B.Kahn, indigenous
 Distephanus anisochaetoides (Sond.) H.Rob. & B.Kahn, indigenous
 Distephanus divaricatus (Steetz) H.Rob. & B.Kahn, indigenous
 Distephanus inhacensis (G.V.Pope) Boon & Glen, indigenous

Dittrichia 
Genus Dittrichia:
 Dittrichia graveolens (L.) Greuter, not indigenous

Doellia 
Genus Doellia:
 Doellia cafra (DC.) Anderb. indigenous

Dolichothrix 
Genus Dolichothrix:
 Dolichothrix ericoides (Lam.) Hilliard & B.L.Burtt, endemic

Doria 
Genus Doria:
 Doria undulata Thunb. accepted as Bolandia pinnatifida (Thunb.) J.C.Manning & Cron, indigenous

Doronicum 
Genus Doronicum:
 Doronicum asplenifolium Lam. accepted as Gerbera linnaei Cass. indigenous
 Doronicum pyrolaefolium Lam. accepted as Gerbera crocea (L.) Kuntze, indigenous
 Doronicum spinulosum Lam. accepted as Gerbera crocea (L.) Kuntze, indigenous

Dymondia 
Genus Dymondia:
 Dymondia margaretae Compton, endemic

Eclipta 
Genus Eclipta:
 Eclipta prostrata (L.) L. not indigenous

Edmondia 
Genus Edmondia:
 Edmondia fasciculata (Andrews) Hilliard, endemic
 Edmondia pinifolia (Lam.) Hilliard, endemic
 Edmondia sesamoides (L.) Hilliard, endemic

Elephantopus 
Genus Elephantopus:
 Elephantopus mollis Kunth, not indigenous, invasive

Elytropappus 
Genus Elytropappus:
 Elytropappus adpressus Harv. accepted as Dicerothamnus adpressus (Harv.) Koekemoer, ined.
 Elytropappus ambiguus DC. accepted as Elytropappus gnaphaloides (L.) Levyns, indigenous
 Elytropappus canescens DC. accepted as Elytropappus gnaphaloides (L.) Levyns
 Elytropappus cyathiformis DC. accepted as Elytropappus hispidus (L.f.) Druce
 Elytropappus glandulosus Less. endemic
 Elytropappus glandulosus Less. var. ambiguus (DC.) Harv. accepted as Elytropappus gnaphaloides (L.) Levyns
 Elytropappus glandulosus Less. var. longifolius DC. accepted as Stoebe muricata Spreng. ex Sch.Bip.
 Elytropappus glandulosus Less. var. microphyllus DC. accepted as Elytropappus glandulosus Less. indigenous
 Elytropappus glandulosus Less. var. microphyllus DC. accepted as Stoebe scabra L.f.
 Elytropappus glandulosus Less. var. pallens DC. accepted as Stoebe muricata Spreng. ex Sch.Bip.
 Elytropappus gnaphaloides (L.) Levyns, endemic
 Elytropappus hispidus (L.f.) Druce, endemic
 Elytropappus longifolius (DC.) Levyns, accepted as Stoebe muricata Spreng. ex Sch.Bip. indigenous
 Elytropappus muricella Steud. ex Sch.Bip. accepted as Stoebe scabra L.f.
 Elytropappus rhinocerotis (L.f.) Less. accepted as Dicerothamnus rhinocerotis (L.f.) Koekemoer, ined.
 Elytropappus scaber (L.f.) Druce, accepted as Stoebe scabra L.f. indigenous
 Elytropappus scaber Kuntze, accepted as Elytropappus gnaphaloides (L.) Levyns

Emilia 
Genus Emilia:
 Emilia ambifaria (S.Moore) C.Jeffrey, accepted as Emilia schinzii (O.Hoffm.) Cron, indigenous
 Emilia hantamensis J.C.Manning & Goldblatt, accepted as Bertilia hantamensis (J.C.Manning & Goldblatt) Cron, endemic
 Emilia limosa (O.Hoffm.) C.Jeffrey, indigenous
 Emilia schinzii (O.Hoffm.) Cron, indigenous
 Emilia transvaalensis (Bolus) C.Jeffrey, indigenous

Enydra 
Genus Enydra:
 Enydra fluctuans Lour. indigenous

Erigeron 
Genus Erigeron:
 Erigeron aegyptiacus L. accepted as Conyza aegyptiaca (L.) Aiton, indigenous
 Erigeron albidus (Willd. ex Spreng.) A.Gray, accepted as Conyza sumatrensis (Retz.) E.Walker var. sumatrensis, not indigenous
 Erigeron ambiguus (DC.) Sch.Bip. accepted as Conyza bonariensis (L.) Cronquist
 Erigeron bonariensis L. accepted as Conyza bonariensis (L.) Cronquist, not indigenous, invasive
 Erigeron bonariensis L. var. microcephalus Cabrera, accepted as Conyza sumatrensis (Retz.) E.Walker var. sumatrensis, not indigenous, invasive
 Erigeron canadensis L. accepted as Conyza canadensis (L.) Cronquist, not indigenous, invasive
 Erigeron capense Houtt. accepted as Hilliardiella capensis (Houtt.) H.Rob. Skvarla & V.A.Funk, indigenous
 Erigeron chilensis (Spreng.) D.Don ex G.Don, accepted as Conyza chilensis Spreng.
 Erigeron crispus Pourr. accepted as Conyza bonariensis (L.) Cronquist, not indigenous, invasive
 Erigeron gouanii L. accepted as Conyza gouanii (L.) Willd. indigenous
 Erigeron hochstetteri (Sch.Bip. ex A.Rich.) Sch.Bip. accepted as Conyza gouanii (L.) Willd. indigenous
 Erigeron incisum Thunb. accepted as Conyza ulmifolia (Burm.f.) Kuntze, indigenous
 Erigeron karvinskianus DC. not indigenous
 Erigeron kraussii Sch.Bip. accepted as Nidorella auriculata DC. indigenous
 Erigeron linifolius Willd. accepted as Conyza bonariensis (L.) Cronquist, not indigenous, invasive
 Erigeron persicifolius Benth. accepted as Conyza attenuata DC. indigenous
 Erigeron pinnatifidum Thunb. accepted as Conyza pinnatifida (Thunb.) Less. endemic
 Erigeron pinnatus L.f. accepted as Conyza pinnata (L.f.) Kuntze, indigenous
 Erigeron spiculosus Hook. & Arn. accepted as Conyza bonariensis (L.) Cronquist, not indigenous, invasive
 Erigeron sprengelii Sch.Bip. accepted as Nidorella auriculata DC. indigenous
 Erigeron sumatrensis Retz. accepted as Conyza sumatrensis (Retz.) E.Walker var. sumatrensis, not indigenous

Eriocephalus 
Genus Eriocephalus:
 Eriocephalus africanus L. indigenous
 Eriocephalus africanus L. var. africanus, endemic
 Eriocephalus africanus L. var. paniculatus (Cass.) M.A.N.Mull. P.P.J.Herman & Kolberg, endemic
 Eriocephalus ambiguus (DC.) M.A.N.Mull. indigenous
 Eriocephalus aromaticus C.A.Sm. endemic
 Eriocephalus aspalathoides DC. accepted as Eriocephalus decussatus Burch.
 Eriocephalus brevifolius (DC.) M.A.N.Mull. endemic
 Eriocephalus capitellatus DC. endemic
 Eriocephalus decussatus Burch. endemic
 Eriocephalus ericoides (L.f.) Druce, indigenous
 Eriocephalus ericoides (L.f.) Druce subsp. ericoides, indigenous
 Eriocephalus ericoides (L.f.) Druce subsp. griquensis M.A.N.Mull. endemic
 Eriocephalus eximius DC. indigenous
 Eriocephalus glandulosus M.A.N.Mull. endemic
 Eriocephalus grandiflorus M.A.N.Mull. endemic
 Eriocephalus hirsutus Burtt Davy, accepted as Eriocephalus luederitzianus O.Hoffm.
 Eriocephalus karooicus M.A.N.Mull. endemic
 Eriocephalus longifolius M.A.N.Mull. endemic
 Eriocephalus luederitzianus O.Hoffm. indigenous
 Eriocephalus macroglossus B.Nord. endemic
 Eriocephalus merxmuelleri M.A.N.Mull. indigenous
 Eriocephalus microcephalus DC. endemic
 Eriocephalus microphyllus DC. indigenous
 Eriocephalus microphyllus DC. var. carnosus M.A.N.Mull. endemic
 Eriocephalus microphyllus DC. var. microphyllus, endemic
 Eriocephalus microphyllus DC. var. pubescens (DC.) M.A.N.Mull. endemic
 Eriocephalus namaquensis M.A.N.Mull. indigenous
 Eriocephalus pauperrimus Merxm. & Eberle, indigenous
 Eriocephalus pedicellaris DC. endemic
 Eriocephalus pteronioides DC. accepted as Eriocephalus pedicellaris DC.
 Eriocephalus pubescens DC. accepted as Eriocephalus microphyllus DC. var. pubescens (DC.) M.A.N.Mull.
 Eriocephalus punctulatus DC. indigenous
 Eriocephalus purpureus Burch. endemic
 Eriocephalus racemosus L. indigenous
 Eriocephalus racemosus L. var. affinis (DC.) Harv. endemic
 Eriocephalus racemosus L. var. racemosus, endemic
 Eriocephalus scariosissimus S.Moore, accepted as Eriocephalus scariosus DC.
 Eriocephalus scariosus DC. indigenous
 Eriocephalus septulifer DC. accepted as Eriocephalus africanus L. var. africanus
 Eriocephalus sericeus Gaudich. ex DC. accepted as Eriocephalus africanus L. var. paniculatus (Cass.) M.A.N.Mull. P.P.J.Herman & Kolberg
 Eriocephalus spinescens Burch. endemic
 Eriocephalus tenuifolius DC. indigenous
 Eriocephalus tenuipes C.A.Sm. endemic
 Eriocephalus xerophilus Schltr. accepted as Eriocephalus purpureus Burch.

Erlangia 
Genus Erlangia:
 Erlangea misera (Oliv. & Hiern) S.Moore, indigenous
 Erlangea vernonioides Muschl. accepted as Cyanthillium vernonioides (Muschl.) H.Rob. indigenous

Eschenbachia 
Genus Eschenbachia:
 Eschenbachia aegyptiaca (L.) Brouillet, accepted as Conyza aegyptiaca (L.) Aiton, indigenous
 Eschenbachia persicifolia (Benth.) Exell, accepted as Conyza attenuata DC. indigenous

Ethulia 
Genus Ethulia:
 Ethulia auriculata Thunb. accepted as Dichrocephala integrifolia (L.f.) Kuntze subsp. integrifolia
 Ethulia conyzoides L.f. not indigenous
 Ethulia conyzoides L.f. subsp. conyzoides, not indigenous
 Ethulia conyzoides L.f. subsp. kraussii (Walp.) M.G.Gilbert & C.Jeffrey, not indigenous
 Ethulia integrifolia (L.f.) D.Don, accepted as Dichrocephala integrifolia (L.f.) Kuntze subsp. integrifolia, indigenous

Eumorphia 
Genus Eumorphia:
 Eumorphia corymbosa E.Phillips, endemic
 Eumorphia davyi Bolus, endemic
 Eumorphia dregeana DC. endemic
 Eumorphia prostrata Bolus, indigenous
 Eumorphia sericea J.M.Wood & M.S.Evans, indigenous
 Eumorphia sericea J.M.Wood & M.S.Evans subsp. robustior Hilliard & B.L.Burtt, endemic
 Eumorphia sericea J.M.Wood & M.S.Evans subsp. sericea, indigenous

Eupatorium 
Genus Eupatorium:
 Eupatorium capense A.Spreng. accepted as Gymnanthemum capensis (A.Spreng.) J.C.Manning & Swelank. indigenous
 Eupatorium coloratum Willd. accepted as Gymnanthemum coloratum (Willd.) H.Rob. & B.Kahn, indigenous
 Eupatorium sordidum Less. accepted as Bartlettina sordida (Less.) R.M.King & H.Rob. not indigenous

Euryops 
Genus Euryops:
 Euryops abrotanifolius (L.) DC. endemic
 Euryops acraeus M.D.Hend. indigenous
 Euryops algoensis DC. endemic
 Euryops annae E.Phillips, indigenous
 Euryops annuus Compton, endemic
 Euryops anthemoides B.Nord. indigenous
 Euryops anthemoides B.Nord. subsp. anthemoides, endemic
 Euryops anthemoides B.Nord. subsp. astrotrichus B.Nord. endemic
 Euryops asparagoides (Licht. ex Less.) DC. indigenous
 Euryops bolusii B.Nord. endemic
 Euryops brachypodus (DC.) B.Nord. endemic
 Euryops brevilobus Compton, endemic
 Euryops brevipapposus M.D.Hend. indigenous
 Euryops brevipes B.Nord. endemic
 Euryops calvescens DC. endemic
 Euryops candollei Harv. indigenous
 Euryops chrysanthemoides (DC.) B.Nord. endemic
 Euryops ciliatus B.Nord. endemic
 Euryops cuneatus B.Nord. endemic
 Euryops decipiens Schltr. endemic
 Euryops decumbens B.Nord. indigenous
 Euryops dentatus B.Nord. endemic
 Euryops discoideus Burtt Davy, endemic
 Euryops dregeanus Sch.Bip. indigenous
 Euryops dyeri Hutch. endemic
 Euryops empetrifolius DC. indigenous
 Euryops erectus (Compton) B.Nord. endemic
 Euryops ericifolius (Bel.) B.Nord. endemic
 Euryops ericoides (L.f.) B.Nord. endemic
 Euryops euryopoides (DC.) B.Nord. endemic
 Euryops evansii Schltr. indigenous
 Euryops evansii Schltr. subsp. evansii, indigenous
 Euryops evansii Schltr. subsp. parvus B.Nord. indigenous
 Euryops exsudans B.Nord. & V.R.Clark, endemic
 Euryops floribundus N.E.Br. endemic
 Euryops galpinii Bolus, endemic
 Euryops gilfillanii Bolus, endemic
 Euryops glutinosus B.Nord. endemic
 Euryops gracilipes B.Nord. endemic
 Euryops hebecarpus (DC.) B.Nord. endemic
 Euryops hypnoides B.Nord. endemic
 Euryops imbricatus (Thunb.) DC. endemic
 Euryops indecorus B.Nord. endemic
 Euryops integrifolius B.Nord. endemic
 Euryops lasiocladus (DC.) B.Nord. endemic
 Euryops lateriflorus (L.f.) DC. indigenous
 Euryops latifolius B.Nord. endemic
 Euryops laxus (Harv.) Burtt Davy, indigenous
 Euryops leiocarpus (DC.) B.Nord. endemic
 Euryops linearis Harv. endemic
 Euryops linifolius (L.) DC. endemic
 Euryops longipes DC. indigenous
 Euryops longipes DC. var. lasiocarpus B.Nord. endemic
 Euryops longipes DC. var. longipes, endemic
 Euryops marlothii B.Nord. endemic
 Euryops microphyllus (Compton) B.Nord. endemic
 Euryops mirus B.Nord. endemic
 Euryops montanus Schltr. indigenous
 Euryops muirii C.A.Sm. endemic
 Euryops multifidus (Thunb.) DC. endemic
 Euryops munitus (L.f.) B.Nord. endemic
 Euryops namaquensis Schltr. endemic
 Euryops namibensis (Merxm.) B.Nord. indigenous
 Euryops nodosus B.Nord. endemic
 Euryops oligoglossus DC. subsp. oligoglossus, indigenous
 Euryops oligoglossus DC. subsp. racemosus (DC.) B.Nord. endemic
 Euryops othonnoides (DC.) B.Nord. endemic
 Euryops pectinatus (L.) Cass. indigenous
 Euryops pectinatus (L.) Cass. subsp. lobulatus B.Nord. endemic
 Euryops pectinatus (L.) Cass. subsp. pectinatus, endemic
 Euryops pedunculatus N.E.Br. indigenous
 Euryops petraeus B.Nord. endemic
 Euryops pinnatipartitus (DC.) B.Nord. endemic
 Euryops pleiodontus B.Nord. endemic
 Euryops polytrichoides (Harv.) B.Nord. endemic
 Euryops proteoides B.Nord. & V.R.Clark, endemic
 Euryops rehmannii Compton, endemic
 Euryops rosulatus B.Nord. endemic
 Euryops rupestris Schltr. indigenous
 Euryops rupestris Schltr. var. dasycarpus B.Nord. endemic
 Euryops rupestris Schltr. var. rupestris, endemic
 Euryops serra DC. endemic
 Euryops sparsiflorus S.Moore, accepted as Crassothonna alba (Compton) B.Nord.
 Euryops spathaceus DC. endemic
 Euryops speciosissimus DC. endemic
 Euryops subcarnosus DC. indigenous
 Euryops subcarnosus DC. subsp. foetidus B.Nord. indigenous
 Euryops subcarnosus DC. subsp. minor B.Nord. endemic
 Euryops subcarnosus DC. subsp. subcarnosus, endemic
 Euryops subcarnosus DC. subsp. vulgaris B.Nord. indigenous
 Euryops sulcatus (Thunb.) Harv. endemic
 Euryops tagetoides (DC.) B.Nord. endemic
 Euryops tenuilobus (DC.) B.Nord. endemic
 Euryops tenuissimus (L.) DC. indigenous
 Euryops tenuissimus (L.) DC. subsp. tenuissimus, indigenous
 Euryops tenuissimus (L.) DC. subsp. trifurcatus (L.f.) B.Nord. endemic
 Euryops thunbergii B.Nord. endemic
 Euryops transvaalensis Klatt, indigenous
 Euryops transvaalensis Klatt subsp. setilobus (N.E.Br.) B.Nord. indigenous
 Euryops transvaalensis Klatt subsp. transvaalensis, indigenous
 Euryops trifidus (L.f.) DC. endemic
 Euryops trilobus Harv. endemic
 Euryops tysonii E.Phillips, indigenous
 Euryops ursinoides B.Nord. endemic
 Euryops virgatus B.Nord. endemic
 Euryops virgineus (L.f.) DC. endemic
 Euryops wageneri Compton, endemic
 Euryops zeyheri B.Nord. endemic

Facelis 
Genus Facelis:
 Facelis retusa (Lam.) Sch.Bip. not indigenous

Felicia 
Genus Felicia:
 Felicia aculeata Grau, endemic
 Felicia aethiopica (Burm.f.) Bolus & Wolley-Dod ex Adamson & T.M.Salter, indigenous
 Felicia aethiopica (Burm.f.) Bolus & Wolley-Dod ex Adamson & T.M.Salter subsp. aethiopica, endemic
 Felicia aethiopica (Burm.f.) Bolus & Wolley-Dod ex Adamson & T.M.Salter subsp. ecklonis (Less.) Grau, endemic
 Felicia amelloides (L.) Voss, endemic
 Felicia amoena (Sch.Bip.) Levyns, indigenous
 Felicia amoena (Sch.Bip.) Levyns subsp. amoena, endemic
 Felicia amoena (Sch.Bip.) Levyns subsp. latifolia Grau, endemic
 Felicia amoena (Sch.Bip.) Levyns subsp. stricta (DC.) Grau, endemic
 Felicia annectens (Harv.) Grau, endemic
 Felicia australis (Alston) E.Phillips, endemic
 Felicia bechuanica Mattf. indigenous
 Felicia bellidioides Schltr. indigenous
 Felicia bellidioides Schltr. subsp. bellidioides, endemic
 Felicia bellidioides Schltr. subsp. foliata Grau, endemic
 Felicia bergeriana (Spreng.) O.Hoffm. endemic
 Felicia brevifolia (DC.) Grau, indigenous
 Felicia burkei (Harv.) L.Bolus, indigenous
 Felicia caespitosa Grau, indigenous
 Felicia cana DC. endemic
 Felicia canaliculata Grau, endemic
 Felicia clavipilosa Grau, indigenous
 Felicia clavipilosa Grau subsp. clavipilosa, indigenous
 Felicia clavipilosa Grau subsp. transvaalensis Grau, indigenous
 Felicia comptonii Grau, endemic
 Felicia cymbalariae (Aiton) Bolus & Wolley-Dod ex Adamson & T.M.Salter, indigenous
 Felicia cymbalariae (Aiton) Bolus & Wolley-Dod ex Adamson & T.M.Salter subsp. cymbalariae, endemic
 Felicia cymbalariae (Aiton) Bolus & Wolley-Dod ex Adamson & T.M.Salter subsp. ionops (Harv.) Grau, endemic
 Felicia cymbalarioides (DC.) Grau, endemic
 Felicia denticulata Grau, endemic
 Felicia deserti Schltr. ex Grau, endemic
 Felicia diffusa (DC.) Grau, indigenous
 Felicia diffusa (DC.) Grau subsp. diffusa, endemic
 Felicia diffusa (DC.) Grau subsp. khamiesbergensis Grau, endemic
 Felicia douglasii J.C.Manning & Magee, endemic
 Felicia drakensbergensis J.M.Wood & M.S.Evans, indigenous
 Felicia dregei DC. endemic
 Felicia dubia Cass. endemic
 Felicia ebracteata Grau, endemic
 Felicia echinata (Thunb.) Nees, endemic
 Felicia elongata (Thunb.) O.Hoffm. endemic
 Felicia erigeroides DC. endemic
 Felicia esterhuyseniae Grau, endemic
 Felicia fascicularis DC. indigenous
 Felicia ferulacea Compton, endemic
 Felicia filifolia (Vent.) Burtt Davy, indigenous
 Felicia filifolia (Vent.) Burtt Davy subsp. bodkinii (Compton) Grau, endemic
 Felicia filifolia (Vent.) Burtt Davy subsp. filifolia, indigenous
 Felicia filifolia (Vent.) Burtt Davy subsp. schaeferi (Dinter) Grau, indigenous
 Felicia filifolia (Vent.) Burtt Davy subsp. schlechteri (Compton) Grau, endemic
 Felicia flanaganii Bolus, endemic
 Felicia fruticosa (L.) G.Nicholson, indigenous
 Felicia fruticosa (L.) G.Nicholson subsp. brevipedunculata (Hutch.) Grau, endemic
 Felicia fruticosa (L.) G.Nicholson subsp. fruticosa, endemic
 Felicia heterophylla (Cass.) Grau, endemic
 Felicia hirsuta DC. indigenous
 Felicia hirta (Thunb.) Grau, endemic
 Felicia hispida (DC.) Grau, endemic
 Felicia hyssopifolia (P.J.Bergius) Nees, indigenous
 Felicia hyssopifolia (P.J.Bergius) Nees subsp. glabra (DC.) Grau, endemic
 Felicia hyssopifolia (P.J.Bergius) Nees subsp. hyssopifolia, endemic
 Felicia hyssopifolia (P.J.Bergius) Nees subsp. polyphylla (Harv.) Grau, indigenous
 Felicia josephinae J.C.Manning & Goldblatt, endemic
 Felicia joubertinae Grau, indigenous
 Felicia joubertinae Grau subsp. glabrescens Grau, endemic
 Felicia joubertinae Grau subsp. joubertinae, endemic
 Felicia lasiocarpa DC. endemic
 Felicia linearis N.E.Br. indigenous
 Felicia linifolia (Harv.) Grau, endemic
 Felicia macrorrhiza (Thunb.) DC. endemic
 Felicia martinsiana S.Ortiz, endemic
 Felicia merxmuelleri Grau, endemic
 Felicia microcephala Grau, endemic
 Felicia microsperma DC. indigenous
 Felicia minima (Hutch.) Grau, endemic
 Felicia mossamedensis (Hiern) MendonÃ§a, indigenous
 Felicia muricata (Thunb.) Nees, indigenous
 Felicia muricata (Thunb.) Nees subsp. cinerascens Grau, indigenous
 Felicia muricata (Thunb.) Nees subsp. muricata, indigenous
 Felicia muricata (Thunb.) Nees subsp. strictifolia Grau, endemic
 Felicia namaquana (Harv.) Merxm. indigenous
 Felicia nigrescens Grau, endemic
 Felicia nordenstamii Grau, endemic
 Felicia odorata Compton, endemic
 Felicia oleosa Grau, endemic
 Felicia ovata (Thunb.) Compton, endemic
 Felicia petiolata (Harv.) N.E.Br. indigenous
 Felicia puberula Grau, endemic
 Felicia quinquenervia (Klatt) Grau, indigenous
 Felicia rogersii S.Moore, endemic
 Felicia rosulata Yeo, indigenous
 Felicia scabrida (DC.) Range, endemic
 Felicia serrata (Thunb.) Grau, endemic
 Felicia stenophylla Grau, endemic
 Felicia tenella (L.) Nees, indigenous
 Felicia tenella (L.) Nees subsp. cotuloides (DC.) Grau, endemic
 Felicia tenella (L.) Nees subsp. longifolia (DC.) Grau, endemic
 Felicia tenella (L.) Nees subsp. pusilla (Harv.) Grau, endemic
 Felicia tenella (L.) Nees subsp. tenella, endemic
 Felicia tenera (DC.) Grau, endemic
 Felicia tsitsikamae Grau, endemic
 Felicia uliginosa (J.M.Wood & M.S.Evans) Grau, indigenous
 Felicia venusta S.Moore, endemic
 Felicia westae (Fourc.) Grau, endemic
 Felicia whitehillensis Compton, endemic
 Felicia wrightii Hilliard & B.L.Burtt, endemic
 Felicia zeyheri (Less.) Nees, indigenous
 Felicia zeyheri (Less.) Nees subsp. linifolia (Harv.) Grau, endemic
 Felicia zeyheri (Less.) Nees subsp. zeyheri, endemic

Flaveria 
Genus Flaveria:
 Flaveria bidentis (L.) Kuntze, not indigenous, invasive

Foveolina 
Genus Foveolina:
 Foveolina albida (DC.) Kallersjo, accepted as Foveolina dichotoma (DC.) Kallersjo
 Foveolina albidiformis (Thell.) Kallersjo, accepted as Foveolina burchellii (DC.) Magee, endemic
 Foveolina burchellii (DC.) Magee, indigenous
 Foveolina dichotoma (DC.) Kallersjo, indigenous
 Foveolina tenella (DC.) Kallersjo, endemic

Gaillardia 
Genus Gaillardia:
 Gaillardia aristata Pursh, not indigenous
 Gaillardia pulchella Foug. not indigenous

Galeomma 
Genus Galeomma:
 Galeomma oculus-cati (L.f.) Rauschert, endemic
 Galeomma stenolepis (S.Moore) Hilliard, indigenous

Galinsoga 
Genus Galinsoga:
 Galinsoga ciliata (Raf.) S.F.Blake, accepted as Galinsoga quadriradiata Ruiz & Pav. not indigenous
 Galinsoga parviflora Cav. not indigenous
 Galinsoga quadriradiata Ruiz & Pav. not indigenous, invasive

Gamochaeta 
Genus Gamochaeta:
 Gamochaeta calviceps (Fernald) Cabrera, not indigenous
 Gamochaeta coarctata (Willd.) Kerguelen, not indigenous
 Gamochaeta pensylvanica (Willd.) Cabrera, not indigenous
 Gamochaeta spicata (Lam.) Cabrera, accepted as Gamochaeta coarctata (Willd.) Kerguelen, not indigenous
 Gamochaeta spiciformis (Sch.Bip.) Cabrera, not indigenous
 Gamochaeta subfalcata (Cabrera) Cabrera, not indigenous

Garuleum 
Genus Garuleum:
 Garuleum album S.Moore, endemic
 Garuleum bipinnatum (Thunb.) Less., endemic
 Garuleum latifolium Harv. endemic
 Garuleum pinnatifidum (Thunb.) DC. endemic
 Garuleum schinzii O.Hoffm. indigenous
 Garuleum schinzii O.Hoffm. subsp. schinzii, indigenous
 Garuleum sonchifolium (DC.) Norl. endemic
 Garuleum tanacetifolium (MacOwan) Norl. endemic
 Garuleum woodii Schinz, indigenous

Gazania 
Genus Gazania:
 Gazania caespitosa Bolus, endemic
 Gazania ciliaris DC. endemic
 Gazania heterochaeta DC. indigenous
 Gazania jurineifolia DC. indigenous
 Gazania jurineifolia DC. subsp. jurineifolia, endemic
 Gazania jurineifolia DC. subsp. scabra (DC.) Roessler, indigenous
 Gazania krebsiana Less. indigenous
 Gazania krebsiana Less. subsp. arctotoides (Less.) Roessler, indigenous
 Gazania krebsiana Less. subsp. krebsiana, indigenous
 Gazania krebsiana Less. subsp. serrulata (DC.) Roessler, indigenous
 Gazania lanata Magee & Boatwr. indigenous
 Gazania leiopoda (DC.) Roessler, endemic
 Gazania lichtensteinii Less. indigenous
 Gazania linearis (Thunb.) Druce, indigenous
 Gazania linearis (Thunb.) Druce var. linearis, indigenous
 Gazania linearis (Thunb.) Druce var. ovalis (Harv.) Roessler, endemic
 Gazania maritima Levyns, endemic
 Gazania othonnites (Thunb.) Less. endemic
 Gazania pectinata (Thunb.) Spreng. endemic
 Gazania rigens (L.) Gaertn. indigenous
 Gazania rigens (L.) Gaertn. var. leucolaena (DC.) Roessler, endemic
 Gazania rigens (L.) Gaertn. var. rigens, endemic
 Gazania rigens (L.) Gaertn. var. uniflora (L.f.) Roessler, indigenous
 Gazania rigida (Burm.f.) Roessler, indigenous
 Gazania schenckii O.Hoffm. indigenous
 Gazania serrata DC. endemic
 Gazania splendidissima Mucina, Magee & Boatwr. indigenous
 Gazania tenuifolia Less. indigenous

Geigeria 
Genus Geigeria:
 Geigeria acaulis (Sch.Bip.) Benth. & Hook.f. ex Oliv. & Hiern, indigenous
 Geigeria aspera Harv. indigenous
 Geigeria aspera Harv. var. aspera, indigenous
 Geigeria aspera Harv. var. rivularis (J.M.Wood & M.S.Evans) Merxm. endemic
 Geigeria brevifolia (DC.) Harv. indigenous
 Geigeria burkei Harv. indigenous
 Geigeria burkei Harv. subsp. burkei var. burkei, indigenous
 Geigeria burkei Harv. subsp. burkei var. elata, indigenous
 Geigeria burkei Harv. subsp. burkei var. hirtella, endemic
 Geigeria burkei Harv. subsp. burkei var. intermedia, endemic
 Geigeria burkei Harv. subsp. burkei var. zeyheri, indigenous
 Geigeria burkei Harv. subsp. diffusa (Harv.) Merxm. indigenous
 Geigeria burkei Harv. subsp. fruticulosa Merxm. indigenous
 Geigeria burkei Harv. subsp. valida Merxm. endemic
 Geigeria elongata Alston, endemic
 Geigeria filifolia Mattf. indigenous
 Geigeria obtusifolia L.Bolus, indigenous
 Geigeria ornativa O.Hoffm. indigenous
 Geigeria ornativa O.Hoffm. subsp. ornativa, indigenous
 Geigeria pectidea (DC.) Harv. indigenous
 Geigeria vigintisquamea O.Hoffm. indigenous

Gerbera 
Genus Gerbera:
 Gerbera ambigua (Cass.) Sch.Bip. indigenous
 Gerbera asplenifolia (Lam.) Spreng. accepted as Gerbera linnaei Cass. indigenous
 Gerbera asplenifolia (Lam.) Spreng. var. buxbaumii DC. accepted as Gerbera linnaei Cass. indigenous
 Gerbera asplenifolia (Lam.) Spreng. var. linearis Harv. accepted as Gerbera serrata (Thunb.) Druce, indigenous
 Gerbera aurantiaca Sch.Bip. endemic
 Gerbera burmanni Cass. accepted as Gerbera crocea (L.) Kuntze, indigenous
 Gerbera burmanni Cass. var. sinuata (Thunb.) Harv. accepted as Gerbera sinuata (Thunb.) Spreng. endemic
 Gerbera cordata (Thunb.) Less. endemic
 Gerbera coronopifolia (L.) Cass. accepted as Gerbera linnaei Cass. indigenous
 Gerbera crenata (Thunb.) Ker Gawl. accepted as Mairia crenata (Thunb.) Nees, indigenous
 Gerbera crocea (L.) Kuntze, endemic
 Gerbera ferruginea DC. accepted as Gerbera serrata (Thunb.) Druce, indigenous
 Gerbera ferruginea DC. var. linearis (Harv.) Dummer, accepted as Gerbera serrata (Thunb.) Druce, indigenous
 Gerbera galpinii Klatt, indigenous
 Gerbera gerbera (L.) Kuntze, accepted as Gerbera linnaei Cass. indigenous
 Gerbera grandis J.C.Manning & Simka, endemic
 Gerbera hirsuta Spreng. ex DC. accepted as Gerbera tomentosa DC. indigenous
 Gerbera integralis Sond. ex Harv. accepted as Gerbera crocea (L.) Kuntze, indigenous
 Gerbera jamesonii Bolus ex Adlam, indigenous
 Gerbera lagascae Cass. accepted as Gerbera linnaei Cass. indigenous
 Gerbera lanata (Harv.) Dummer, accepted as Gerbera tomentosa DC. indigenous
 Gerbera leucothrix Harv. accepted as Gerbera tomentosa DC. indigenous
 Gerbera linnaei Cass. endemic
 Gerbera macrocephala Less. accepted as Gerbera crocea (L.) Kuntze, indigenous
 Gerbera microcephala Less. accepted as Gerbera tomentosa DC. indigenous
 Gerbera natalensis Sch.Bip. indigenous
 Gerbera ovata J.C.Manning & Simka, endemic
 Gerbera parva N.E.Br. endemic
 Gerbera piloselloides (L.) Cass. indigenous
 Gerbera serrata (Thunb.) Druce, endemic
 Gerbera sinuata (Thunb.) Spreng. endemic
 Gerbera sinuata (Thunb.) Spreng. var. undulata Sch.Bip. accepted as Gerbera viridifolia (DC.) Sch.Bip. indigenous
 Gerbera sinuata Less. accepted as Gerbera serrata (Thunb.) Druce, indigenous
 Gerbera sylvicola I.M.Johnson, N.R.Crouch & T.J.Edwards, endemic
 Gerbera tomentosa DC. endemic
 Gerbera tomentosa DC. var. elliptica DC. accepted as Gerbera ovata J.C.Manning & Simka, indigenous
 Gerbera tomentosa DC. var. lanata Harv. accepted as Gerbera tomentosa DC. indigenous
 Gerbera tomentosa DC. var. polyglossa DC. accepted as Gerbera tomentosa DC. indigenous
( Gerbera tomentosa DC. var. ustulata DC. accepted as Gerbera tomentosa DC. indigenous
 Gerbera viridifolia (DC.) Sch.Bip. indigenous
 Gerbera viridifolia (DC.) Sch.Bip. subsp. natalensis (Sch.Bip.) H.V.Hansen, accepted as Gerbera natalensis Sch.Bip.
 Gerbera wrightii Harv. endemic

Gibbaria 
Genus Gibbaria:
 Gibbaria glabra (N.E.Br.) B.Nord. accepted as Osteospermum glabrum N.E.Br. endemic
 Gibbaria ilicifolia (L.) Norl. accepted as Osteospermum ilicifolium L. endemic
 Gibbaria scabra (Thunb.) Norl. accepted as Osteospermum scabrum Thunb. endemic

Glebionis 
Genus Glebionis:
 Glebionis coronaria (L.) Cass. ex Spach, not indigenous

Gnaphalium 
Genus Gnaphalium:
 Gnaphalium argyrocoma Sch.Bip. accepted as Dolichothrix ericoides (Lam.) Hilliard & B.L.Burtt, indigenous
 Gnaphalium austroafricanum Hilliard, indigenous
 Gnaphalium capense Hilliard, endemic
 Gnaphalium coarctatum Willd. accepted as Gamochaeta coarctata (Willd.) Kerguelen, not indigenous
 Gnaphalium confine Harv. indigenous
 Gnaphalium declinatum L.f. endemic
 Gnaphalium englerianum (O.Hoffm.) Hilliard & B.L.Burtt, endemic
 Gnaphalium filagopsis Hilliard & B.L.Burtt, indigenous
 Gnaphalium gnaphalodes (DC.) Hilliard & B.L.Burtt, endemic
 Gnaphalium griquense Hilliard & B.L.Burtt, indigenous
 Gnaphalium limicola Hilliard, indigenous
 Gnaphalium nelsonii Burtt Davy, endemic
 Gnaphalium pauciflorum DC. endemic
 Gnaphalium polycaulon Pers. not indigenous
 Gnaphalium simii (Bolus) Hilliard & B.L.Burtt, endemic
 Gnaphalium subfalcatum Cabrera, accepted as Gamochaeta subfalcata (Cabrera) Cabrera, not indigenous
 Gnaphalium vestitum Thunb. endemic

Gongrothamnus 
Genus Gongrothamnus:
 Gongrothamnus aurantiacus O.Hoffm. accepted as Distephanus divaricatus (Steetz) H.Rob. & B.Kahn, indigenous
 Gongrothamnus divaricatus Steetz, accepted as Distephanus divaricatus (Steetz) H.Rob. & B.Kahn, indigenous

Gongyloglossa 
Genus Gongyloglossa:
 Gongyloglossa tortilis (DC.) Koekemoer, ined. accepted as Disparago tortilis (DC.) Sch.Bip. endemic

Gorteria 
Genus Gorteria:
 Gorteria alienata (Thunb.) Stangb. & Anderb. endemic
 Gorteria ciliaris L. accepted as Cullumia reticulata (L.) Greuter, M.V.Agab. & Wagenitz, indigenous
 Gorteria corymbosa DC. indigenous
 Gorteria diffusa Thunb. indigenous
 Gorteria diffusa Thunb. subsp. calendulacea (DC.) Roessler, accepted as Gorteria diffusa Thunb. subsp. diffusa, endemic
 Gorteria diffusa Thunb. subsp. diffusa, indigenous
 Gorteria personata L. indigenous
 Gorteria personata L. subsp. gracilis Roessler, accepted as Gorteria piloselloides (Cass.) Stangb. & Anderb. endemic
 Gorteria personata L. subsp. personata, endemic
 Gorteria piloselloides (Cass.) Stangb. & Anderb. endemic
 Gorteria warmbadica Stangb. & Anderb. indigenous

Grangea 
Genus Grangea:
 Grangea adansonii Cass. accepted as Grangea maderaspatana (L.) Poir. indigenous
 Grangea maderaspatana (L.) Poir. indigenous

Guizotia 
Genus Guizotia:
 Guizotia abyssinica (L.f.) Cass. not indigenous

Gymnanthemum 
Genus Gymnanthemum:
 Gymnanthemum amygdalinum (Delile) Sch.Bip. ex Walp. indigenous
 Gymnanthemum capensis (A.Spreng.) J.C.Manning & Swelank. indigenous
 Gymnanthemum coloratum (Willd.) H.Rob. & B.Kahn, indigenous
 Gymnanthemum corymbosum (L.f.) H.Rob. indigenous
 Gymnanthemum crataegifolium (Hutch.) H.Rob. indigenous
 Gymnanthemum koekemoerae H.Rob. & V.A.Funk, endemic
 Gymnanthemum mespilifolium (Less.) H.Rob. accepted as Gymnanthemum capensis (A.Spreng.) J.C.Manning & Swelank. indigenous
 Gymnanthemum myrianthum (Hook.f.) H.Rob. indigenous
 Gymnanthemum theophrastifolium (Schweinf. ex Oliv. & Hiern) H.Rob. indigenous
 Gymnanthemum triflorum (Bremek.) H.Rob. endemic

Gymnodiscus 
Genus Gymnodiscus:
 Gymnodiscus capillaris (L.f.) DC. endemic
 Gymnodiscus linearifolia DC. endemic

Gymnopentzia 
Genus Gymnopentzia:
 Gymnopentzia bifurcata Benth. indigenous

Gymnostephium 
Genus Gymnostephium:
 Gymnostephium angustifolium Harv. accepted as Zyrphelis ciliaris (DC.) Zinnecker subsp. angustifolia (Harv.) Zinnecker, endemic
 Gymnostephium ciliare (DC.) Harv. accepted as Zyrphelis ciliaris (DC.) Zinnecker subsp. ciliaris, endemic
 Gymnostephium corymbosum (Turcz.) Harv. accepted as Zyrphelis nervosa Zinnecker, endemic
 Gymnostephium fruticosum DC. accepted as Zyrphelis fruticosa (DC.) Zinnecker, endemic
 Gymnostephium gracile Less. accepted as Zyrphelis gracilis (Less.) Zinnecker, endemic
 Gymnostephium hirsutum Less. accepted as Zyrphelis ciliaris (DC.) Zinnecker subsp. hirsuta (Less.) Zinnecker, endemic
 Gymnostephium leve Bolus, accepted as Zyrphelis levis (Bolus) Zinnecker, endemic
 Gymnostephium papposum G.L.Nesom, accepted as Zyrphelis corymbosa (Harv.) Kuntze, endemic

Haplocarpha 
Genus Haplocarpha:
 Haplocarpha lanata (Thunb.) Less. endemic
 Haplocarpha lyrata Harv. endemic
 Haplocarpha nervosa (Thunb.) Beauverd, indigenous
 Haplocarpha oocephala (DC.) Beyers, endemic
 Haplocarpha parvifolia (Schltr.) Beauverd, endemic
 Haplocarpha scaposa Harv. indigenous

Hedypnois 
Genus Hedypnois:
 Hedypnois cretica (L.) Dum.Cours. accepted as Hedypnois rhagadioloides (L.) F.W.Schmidt, not indigenous
 Hedypnois rhagadioloides (L.) F.W.Schmidt, not indigenous, invasive

Helianthus 
Genus Helianthus:
 Helianthus annuus L. not indigenous, invasive
 Helianthus argophyllus Torr. & A.Gray, not indigenous
 Helianthus debilis Nutt. subsp. cucumerifolius (Torr. & A.Gray) Heiser, not indigenous

Helichrysopsis 
Genus Helichrysopsis:
 Helichrysopsis septentrionalis (Vatke) Hilliard, indigenous

Helichrysum 
Genus Helichrysum:
 Helichrysum acrophilum Bolus, endemic
 Helichrysum acutatum DC. indigenous
 Helichrysum adenocarpum DC. indigenous
 Helichrysum adenocarpum DC. subsp. adenocarpum, indigenous
 Helichrysum adenocarpum DC. subsp. ammophilum Hilliard, indigenous
 Helichrysum albanense Hilliard, endemic
 Helichrysum albertense Hilliard, endemic
 Helichrysum albilanatum Hilliard, endemic
 Helichrysum albirosulatum Killick, indigenous
 Helichrysum albo-brunneum S.Moore, indigenous
 Helichrysum album N.E.Br. endemic
 Helichrysum allioides Less. endemic
 Helichrysum alsinoides DC. indigenous
 Helichrysum alticolum Bolus, endemic
 Helichrysum altigenum Schltr. & Moeser, endemic
 Helichrysum ammitophilum Hilliard, indigenous
 Helichrysum amplectens Hilliard, endemic
 Helichrysum anomalum Less. indigenous
 Helichrysum appendiculatum (L.f.) Less. indigenous
 Helichrysum archeri Compton, endemic
 Helichrysum arenicola M.D.Hend. indigenous
 Helichrysum aretioides Turcz. accepted as Bryomorphe aretioides (Turcz.) Druce, indigenous
 Helichrysum argentissimum J.M.Wood, indigenous
 Helichrysum argyrolepis MacOwan, indigenous
 Helichrysum argyrophyllum DC. endemic
 Helichrysum argyrosphaerum DC. indigenous
 Helichrysum asperum (Thunb.) Hilliard & B.L.Burtt, indigenous
 Helichrysum asperum (Thunb.) Hilliard & B.L.Burtt var. albidulum (DC.) Hilliard, indigenous
 Helichrysum asperum (Thunb.) Hilliard & B.L.Burtt var. appressifolium (Moeser) Hilliard, endemic
 Helichrysum asperum (Thunb.) Hilliard & B.L.Burtt var. asperum, endemic
 Helichrysum asperum (Thunb.) Hilliard & B.L.Burtt var. comosum (Sch.Bip.) Hilliard, endemic
 Helichrysum asperum (Thunb.) Hilliard & B.L.Burtt var. glabrum Hilliard, endemic
 Helichrysum athrixiifolium (Kuntze) Moeser, indigenous
 Helichrysum aureofolium Hilliard, endemic
 Helichrysum aureolum Hilliard, indigenous
 Helichrysum aureonitens Sch.Bip. indigenous
 Helichrysum aureum (Houtt.) Merr. indigenous
 Helichrysum aureum (Houtt.) Merr. var. argenteum Hilliard, endemic
 Helichrysum aureum (Houtt.) Merr. var. aureum, endemic
 Helichrysum aureum (Houtt.) Merr. var. candidum Hilliard, indigenous
 Helichrysum aureum (Houtt.) Merr. var. monocephalum (DC.) Hilliard, indigenous
 Helichrysum aureum (Houtt.) Merr. var. scopulosum (M.D.Hend.) Hilliard, endemic
 Helichrysum aureum (Houtt.) Merr. var. serotinum Hilliard, indigenous
 Helichrysum auriceps Hilliard, endemic
 Helichrysum bachmannii Klatt, endemic
 Helichrysum basalticum Hilliard, indigenous
 Helichrysum bellidiastrum Moeser, indigenous
 Helichrysum bellum Hilliard, indigenous
 Helichrysum caespititium (DC.) Harv. indigenous
 Helichrysum callicomum Harv. indigenous
 Helichrysum calocephalum Klatt, indigenous
 Helichrysum candolleanum H.Buek, indigenous
 Helichrysum capense Hilliard, endemic
 Helichrysum catipes (DC.) Harv. endemic
 Helichrysum cephaloideum DC. indigenous
 Helichrysum cerastioides DC. indigenous
 Helichrysum cerastioides DC. var. cerastioides, indigenous
 Helichrysum chionosphaerum DC. indigenous
 Helichrysum chrysargyrum Moeser, indigenous
 Helichrysum citricephalum Hilliard & B.L.Burtt, endemic
 Helichrysum cochleariforme DC. endemic
 Helichrysum confertifolium Klatt, endemic
 Helichrysum confertum N.E.Br. indigenous
 Helichrysum cooperi Harv. indigenous
 Helichrysum coriaceum Harv. accepted as Helichrysum nudifolium (L.) Less. var. nudifolium
 Helichrysum crispum (L.) D.Don, endemic
 Helichrysum cylindriflorum (L.) Hilliard & B.L.Burtt, endemic
 Helichrysum cymosum (L.) D.Don, indigenous
 Helichrysum cymosum (L.) D.Don subsp. calvum Hilliard, indigenous
 Helichrysum cymosum (L.) D.Don subsp. cymosum, endemic
 Helichrysum dasyanthum (Willd.) Sweet, endemic
 Helichrysum dasycephalum O.Hoffm. indigenous
 Helichrysum dasymallum Hilliard, indigenous
 Helichrysum decorum DC. indigenous
 Helichrysum difficile Hilliard, indigenous
 Helichrysum diffusum DC. endemic
 Helichrysum drakensbergense Killick, endemic
 Helichrysum dregeanum Sond. & Harv. indigenous
 Helichrysum dunense Hilliard, endemic
 Helichrysum ecklonis Sond. indigenous
 Helichrysum edwardsii Wild, indigenous
 Helichrysum elegantissimum DC. indigenous
 Helichrysum epapposum Bolus, indigenous
 Helichrysum ephelos Hilliard, endemic
 Helichrysum ericoides (Lam.) Pers. accepted as Dolichothrix ericoides (Lam.) Hilliard & B.L.Burtt, indigenous
 Helichrysum evansii Hilliard, indigenous
 Helichrysum excisum (Thunb.) Less. endemic
 Helichrysum felinum Less. endemic
 Helichrysum flanaganii Bolus, indigenous
 Helichrysum foetidum (L.) Moench, indigenous
 Helichrysum foetidum (L.) Moench var. foetidum, endemic
 Helichrysum fourcadei Hilliard, endemic
 Helichrysum fruticans (L.) D.Don, endemic
 Helichrysum fulvum N.E.Br. endemic
 Helichrysum galpinii N.E.Br. indigenous
 Helichrysum gariepinum DC. indigenous
 Helichrysum gerberifolium Sch.Bip. ex A.Rich. accepted as Helichrysum nudifolium (L.) Less. var. nudifolium
 Helichrysum glaciale Hilliard, indigenous
 Helichrysum glomeratum Klatt, indigenous
 Helichrysum grandibracteatum M.D.Hend. indigenous
 Helichrysum grandiflorum (L.) D.Don, endemic
 Helichrysum griseolanatum Hilliard, indigenous
 Helichrysum griseum Sond. endemic
 Helichrysum gymnocomum DC. indigenous
 Helichrysum hamulosum E.Mey. ex DC. endemic
 Helichrysum harveyanum Wild, indigenous
 Helichrysum haygarthii Bolus, endemic
 Helichrysum hebelepis DC. endemic
 Helichrysum helianthemifolium (L.) D.Don, endemic
 Helichrysum herbaceum (Andrews) Sweet, indigenous
 Helichrysum herniarioides DC. indigenous
 Helichrysum heterolasium Hilliard, indigenous
 Helichrysum homilochrysum S.Moore, indigenous
 Helichrysum hyphocephalum Hilliard, endemic
 Helichrysum hypoleucum Harv. endemic
 Helichrysum incarnatum DC. endemic
 Helichrysum indicum (L.) Grierson, endemic
 Helichrysum infaustum J.M.Wood & M.S.Evans, indigenous
 Helichrysum ingomense Hilliard, endemic
 Helichrysum inornatum Hilliard & B.L.Burtt, endemic
 Helichrysum interjacens Hilliard, indigenous
 Helichrysum interzonale Compton, endemic
 Helichrysum intricatum DC. endemic
 Helichrysum isolepis Bolus, endemic
 Helichrysum jubilatum Hilliard, endemic
 Helichrysum junodii Moeser, endemic
 Helichrysum kraussii Sch.Bip. indigenous
 Helichrysum krebsianum Less. endemic
 Helichrysum krookii Moeser, indigenous
 Helichrysum lambertianum DC. endemic
 Helichrysum lancifolium (Thunb.) Thunb. endemic
 Helichrysum leontonyx DC. indigenous
 Helichrysum lepidissimum S.Moore, indigenous
 Helichrysum leptorhizum DC. endemic
 Helichrysum lesliei Hilliard, endemic
 Helichrysum lineare DC. indigenous
 Helichrysum lineatum Bolus, indigenous
 Helichrysum lingulatum Hilliard, indigenous
 Helichrysum litorale Bolus, endemic
 Helichrysum longifolium DC. indigenous
 Helichrysum longinquum Hilliard, endemic
 Helichrysum lucilioides Less. indigenous
 Helichrysum marginatum DC. indigenous
 Helichrysum mariepscopicum Hilliard, endemic
 Helichrysum marifolium DC. endemic
 Helichrysum marmarolepis S.Moore, endemic
 Helichrysum melanacme DC. indigenous
 Helichrysum miconiifolium DC. indigenous
 Helichrysum micropoides DC. indigenous
 Helichrysum milfordiae Killick, indigenous
 Helichrysum milleri Hilliard, indigenous
 Helichrysum mimetes S.Moore, indigenous
 Helichrysum mixtum (Kuntze) Moeser, indigenous
 Helichrysum mixtum (Kuntze) Moeser var. grandiceps Hilliard, indigenous
 Helichrysum mixtum (Kuntze) Moeser var. mixtum, indigenous
 Helichrysum moeserianum Thell. endemic
 Helichrysum molestum Hilliard, indigenous
 Helichrysum mollifolium Hilliard, endemic
 Helichrysum montanum DC. indigenous
 Helichrysum monticola Hilliard, indigenous
 Helichrysum montis-cati Hilliard, endemic
 Helichrysum mundtii Harv. indigenous
 Helichrysum mutabile Hilliard, indigenous
 Helichrysum nanum Klatt, indigenous
 Helichrysum natalitium DC. endemic
 Helichrysum nimbicola Hilliard, indigenous
 Helichrysum niveum (L.) Less. endemic
 Helichrysum nudifolium (L.) Less. indigenous
 Helichrysum nudifolium (L.) Less. var. nudifolium, indigenous
 Helichrysum nudifolium (L.) Less. var. oxyphyllum (DC.) Beentje, indigenous
 Helichrysum nudifolium (L.) Less. var. pilosellum (L.f.) Beentje, indigenous
 Helichrysum obductum Bolus, endemic
 Helichrysum obtusum (S.Moore) Moeser, indigenous
 Helichrysum odoratissimum (L.) Sweet, indigenous
 Helichrysum odoratissimum (L.) Sweet var. lanatum Sond. accepted as Helichrysum odoratissimum (L.) Sweet
 Helichrysum odoratissimum (L.) Sweet var. odoratissimum, indigenous
 Helichrysum oligopappum Bolus, endemic
 Helichrysum opacum Klatt, indigenous
 Helichrysum oreophilum Klatt, indigenous
 Helichrysum outeniquense Hilliard, endemic
 Helichrysum oxybelium DC. indigenous
 Helichrysum oxyphyllum DC. accepted as Helichrysum nudifolium (L.) Less. var. oxyphyllum (DC.) Beentje
 Helichrysum pagophilum M.D.Hend. indigenous
 Helichrysum paleatum Hilliard, indigenous
 Helichrysum pallidum DC. indigenous
 Helichrysum palustre Hilliard, indigenous
 Helichrysum panduratum O.Hoffm. indigenous
 Helichrysum panduratum O.Hoffm. var. panduratum, endemic
 Helichrysum panduratum O.Hoffm. var. transvaalense Moeser, indigenous
 Helichrysum pandurifolium Schrank, endemic
 Helichrysum pannosum DC. endemic
 Helichrysum paronychioides DC. indigenous
 Helichrysum patulum (L.) D.Don, endemic
 Helichrysum pedunculatum Hilliard & B.L.Burtt, indigenous
 Helichrysum pentzioides Less. endemic
 Helichrysum petiolare Hilliard & B.L.Burtt, endemic
 Helichrysum petraeum Hilliard, indigenous
 Helichrysum pilosellum (L.f.) Less. accepted as Helichrysum nudifolium (L.) Less. var. pilosellum (L.f.) Beentje
 Helichrysum platypterum DC. indigenous
 Helichrysum plebeium DC. endemic
 Helichrysum polycladum Klatt, indigenous
 Helichrysum populifolium DC. endemic
 Helichrysum praecinctum Klatt, endemic
 Helichrysum praecurrens Hilliard, indigenous
 Helichrysum psilolepis Harv. indigenous
 Helichrysum pulchellum DC. endemic
 Helichrysum pumilio (O.Hoffm.) Hilliard & B.L.Burtt, indigenous
 Helichrysum pumilio (O.Hoffm.) Hilliard & B.L.Burtt subsp. fleckii (S.Moore) Hilliard, indigenous
 Helichrysum pumilio (O.Hoffm.) Hilliard & B.L.Burtt subsp. pumilio, endemic
 Helichrysum qathlambanum Hilliard, indigenous
 Helichrysum reflexum N.E.Br. indigenous
 Helichrysum refractum Hilliard, endemic
 Helichrysum retortoides N.E.Br. indigenous
 Helichrysum retortum (L.) Willd. endemic
 Helichrysum revolutum (Thunb.) Less. indigenous
 Helichrysum rosum (P.J.Bergius) Less. indigenous
 Helichrysum rosum (P.J.Bergius) Less. var. arcuatum Hilliard, endemic
 Helichrysum rosum (P.J.Bergius) Less. var. rosum, endemic
 Helichrysum rotundatum Harv. endemic
 Helichrysum rotundifolium (Thunb.) Less. endemic
 Helichrysum ruderale Hilliard & B.L.Burtt, endemic
 Helichrysum rudolfii Hilliard, endemic
 Helichrysum rugulosum Less. indigenous
 Helichrysum rutilans (L.) D.Don, endemic
 Helichrysum saxicola Hilliard, endemic
 Helichrysum scabrum (Thunb.) Less. endemic
 Helichrysum scitulum Hilliard & B.L.Burtt, endemic
 Helichrysum sessile DC. endemic
 Helichrysum sessilioides Hilliard, indigenous
 Helichrysum setosum Harv. indigenous
 Helichrysum silvaticum Hilliard, indigenous
 Helichrysum simillimum DC. endemic
 Helichrysum simulans Harv. & Sond. endemic
 Helichrysum solitarium Hilliard, endemic
 Helichrysum sphaeroideum Moeser, endemic
 Helichrysum spiciforme DC. indigenous
 Helichrysum spiralepis Hilliard & B.L.Burtt, indigenous
 Helichrysum splendidum (Thunb.) Less. indigenous
 Helichrysum spodiophyllum Hilliard & B.L.Burtt, indigenous
 Helichrysum stellatum (L.) Less. endemic
 Helichrysum stenopterum DC. indigenous
 Helichrysum stoloniferum (L.f.) Willd. endemic
 Helichrysum subfalcatum Hilliard, indigenous
 Helichrysum subglomeratum Less. indigenous
 Helichrysum subluteum Burtt Davy, indigenous
 Helichrysum summo-montanum I.Verd. endemic
 Helichrysum sutherlandii Harv. indigenous
 Helichrysum swynnertonii S.Moore, indigenous
 Helichrysum tenax M.D.Hend. indigenous
 Helichrysum tenax M.D.Hend. var. pallidum Hilliard & B.L.Burtt, endemic
 Helichrysum tenax M.D.Hend. var. tenax, indigenous
 Helichrysum tenuiculum DC. endemic
 Helichrysum tenuifolium Killick, endemic
 Helichrysum teretifolium (L.) D.Don, endemic
 Helichrysum thapsus (Kuntze) Moeser, indigenous
 Helichrysum tinctum (Thunb.) Hilliard & B.L.Burtt, endemic
 Helichrysum tomentosulum (Klatt) Merxm. indigenous
 Helichrysum tomentosulum (Klatt) Merxm. subsp. aromaticum (Dinter) Merxm. indigenous
 Helichrysum tongense Hilliard, indigenous
 Helichrysum transmontanum Hilliard, indigenous
 Helichrysum tricostatum (Thunb.) Less. endemic
 Helichrysum trilineatum DC. indigenous
 Helichrysum trilineatum DC. var. brevifolium Harv. accepted as Helichrysum trilineatum DC.
 Helichrysum trilineatum DC. var. tomentosum Harv. accepted as Helichrysum trilineatum DC.
 Helichrysum truncatum Burtt Davy, indigenous
 Helichrysum tysonii Hilliard, endemic
 Helichrysum umbraculigerum Less. indigenous
 Helichrysum uninervium Burtt Davy, endemic
 Helichrysum vernum Hilliard, indigenous
 Helichrysum versicolor O.Hoffm. & Muschl. endemic
 Helichrysum wilmsii Moeser, indigenous
 Helichrysum witbergense Bolus, indigenous
 Helichrysum woodii N.E.Br. endemic
 Helichrysum xerochrysum DC. endemic
 Helichrysum zeyheri Less. indigenous
 Helichrysum zwartbergense Bolus, endemic

Helminthotheca 
Genus Helminthotheca:
 Helminthotheca echioides (L.) Holub, not indigenous, invasive

Hertia 
Genus Hertia:
 Hertia alata (Thunb.) Kuntze, endemic
 Hertia ciliata (Harv.) Kuntze, indigenous
 Hertia cluytiifolia (DC.) Kuntze, endemic
 Hertia kraussii (Sch.Bip.) Fourc. endemic
 Hertia pallens (DC.) Kuntze, indigenous

Heterolepis 
Genus Heterolepis:
 Heterolepis aliena (L.f.) Druce, endemic
 Heterolepis anomala J.C.Manning & Goldblatt, indigenous
 Heterolepis mitis (Burm.) DC. endemic
 Heterolepis peduncularis DC. endemic

Heteromma 
Genus Heteromma:
 Heteromma decurrens (DC.) O.Hoffm. indigenous
 Heteromma krookii (O.Hoffm. & Muschl.) Hilliard & B.L.Burtt, endemic
 Heteromma simplicifolium J.M.Wood & M.S.Evans, endemic

Heterorhachis 
Genus Heterorhachis:
 Heterorhachis aculeata (Burm.f.) Roessler, endemic
 Heterorhachis hystrix J.C.Manning & P.O.Karis, indigenous

Hilliardia 
Genus Hilliardia:
 Hilliardia zuurbergensis (Oliv.) B.Nord. endemic

Hilliardiella 
Genus Hilliardiella:
 Hilliardiella aristata (DC.) H.Rob. indigenous
 Hilliardiella capensis (Houtt.) H.Rob. Skvarla & V.A.Funk, indigenous
 Hilliardiella elaeagnoides (DC.) Swelank. & J.C.Manning, indigenous
 Hilliardiella flanaganii (E.Phillips) H.Rob. Skvarla & V.A.Funk, endemic
 Hilliardiella hirsuta (DC.) H.Rob. indigenous
 Hilliardiella nudicaulis (DC.) H.Rob. endemic
 Hilliardiella oligocephala (DC.) H.Rob. accepted as Hilliardiella elaeagnoides (DC.) Swelank. & J.C.Manning, indigenous
 Hilliardiella pinifolia (Lam.) H.Rob. accepted as Hilliardiella capensis (Houtt.) H.Rob. Skvarla & V.A.Funk, indigenous
 Hilliardiella pseudonatalensis (Wild) H.Rob. Skvarla & V.A.Funk, accepted as Hilliardiella aristata (DC.) H.Rob. indigenous
 Hilliardiella sutherlandii (Harv.) H.Rob. indigenous

Hippia 
Genus Hippia:
 Hippia bolusae Hutch. endemic
 Hippia frutescens (L.) L. endemic
 Hippia hirsuta DC. endemic
 Hippia hutchinsonii Merxm. endemic
 Hippia integrifolia L.f. accepted as Dichrocephala integrifolia (L.f.) Kuntze subsp. integrifolia, indigenous
 Hippia integrifolia Less. accepted as Hippia simplicior Magee & B.Busch, endemic
 Hippia montana Compton, endemic
 Hippia pilosa (P.J.Bergius) Druce, endemic
 Hippia simplicior Magee & B.Busch, indigenous
 Hippia trilobata Hutch. endemic

Hirpicium 
Genus Hirpicium:
 Hirpicium alienatum (Thunb.) Druce, accepted as Gorteria alienata (Thunb.) Stangb. & Anderb. indigenous
 Hirpicium armerioides (DC.) Roessler, indigenous
 Hirpicium bechuanense (S.Moore) Roessler, indigenous
 Hirpicium echinus Less. indigenous
 Hirpicium gazanioides (Harv.) Roessler, indigenous
 Hirpicium integrifolium (Thunb.) Less. endemic
 Hirpicium linearifolium (Bolus) Roessler, indigenous

Hoplophyllum 
Genus Hoplophyllum:
 Hoplophyllum ferox Sond. endemic
 Hoplophyllum spinosum DC. endemic

Hydroidea 
Genus Hydroidea:
 Hydroidea elsiae (Hilliard) P.O.Karis, endemic

Hymenolepis 
Genus Hymenolepis:
 Hymenolepis calva Magoswana & Magee, endemic
 Hymenolepis crithmifolia (L.) Greuter, M.V.Agab. & Wagenitz, endemic
 Hymenolepis cynopus K.Bremer & Kallersjo, endemic
 Hymenolepis dentata (DC.) Kallersjo, endemic
 Hymenolepis glabra Magoswana & Magee, endemic
 Hymenolepis gnidioides (S.Moore) Kallersjo, endemic
 Hymenolepis incisa DC. endemic
 Hymenolepis indivisa (Harv.) Kallersjo, endemic
 Hymenolepis parviflora (L.) DC. accepted as Hymenolepis crithmifolia (L.) Greuter, M.V.Agab. & Wagenitz, endemic
 Hymenolepis speciosa (Hutch.) Kallersjo, endemic

Hyoseris 
Genus Hyoseris:
 Hyoseris rhagadioloides L. accepted as Hedypnois rhagadioloides (L.) F.W.Schmidt, not indigenous

Hypericophyllum 
Genus Hypericophyllum:
 Hypericophyllum elatum (O.Hoffm.) N.E.Br. indigenous

Hypochaeris 
Genus Hypochaeris:
 Hypochaeris brasiliensis (Less.) Griseb. not indigenous
 Hypochaeris glabra L. not indigenous
 Hypochaeris microcephala (Sch.Bip.) Cabrera var. albiflora (Kuntze) Cabrera, not indigenous
 Hypochaeris radicata L. not indigenous

Ifloga 
Genus Ifloga:
 Ifloga ambigua Thell. accepted as Ifloga thellungiana Hilliard & B.L.Burtt, indigenous
 Ifloga anomala Hilliard, endemic
 Ifloga glomerata (Harv.) Schltr. indigenous
 Ifloga molluginoides (DC.) Hilliard, indigenous
 Ifloga repens (L.) Hilliard & B.L.Burtt, endemic
 Ifloga thellungiana Hilliard & B.L.Burtt, endemic
 Ifloga verticillata (L.f.) Fenzl, endemic

Inezia 
Genus Inezia:
 Inezia integrifolia (Klatt) E.Phillips, indigenous
 Inezia speciosa Brusse, endemic

Inula 
Genus Inula:
 Inula foetida L. accepted as Nidorella foetida (L.) DC. indigenous
 Inula glomerata Oliv. & Hiern, indigenous
 Inula graveolens (L.) Desf. accepted as Dittrichia graveolens (L.) Greuter
 Inula paniculata (Klatt) Burtt Davy, indigenous

Inulanthera 
Genus Inulanthera:
 Inulanthera calva (Hutch.) Kallersjo, indigenous
 Inulanthera coronopifolia (Harv.) Kallersjo, endemic
 Inulanthera dregeana (DC.) Kallersjo, endemic
 Inulanthera leucoclada (DC.) Kallersjo, endemic
 Inulanthera montana (J.M.Wood) Kallersjo, endemic
 Inulanthera thodei (Bolus) Kallersjo, indigenous
 Inulanthera tridens (Oliv.) Kallersjo, endemic

Inuloides 
Genus Inuloides:
 Inuloides tomentosa (L.f.) B.Nord. accepted as Osteospermum tomentosum (L.f.) Norl. endemic

Iocaste 
Genus Iocaste:
 Iocaste acicularis (E.Mey. ex DC.) Harv. accepted as Phymaspermum aciculare (E.Mey. ex Harv.) Benth. & Hook. ex B.D.Jacks. indigenous

Keringa 
Genus Keringa:
 Keringa amygdalina (Delile) Raf. accepted as Gymnanthemum amygdalinum (Delile) Sch.Bip. ex Walp. indigenous

Kleinia 
Genus Kleinia:
 Kleinia cephalophora Compton, indigenous
 Kleinia fulgens Hook.f. indigenous
 Kleinia galpinii Hook.f. indigenous
 Kleinia longiflora DC. indigenous
 Kleinia stapeliiformis (E.Phillips) Stapf, endemic
 Kleinia venteri Van Jaarsv. endemic

Klenzea 
Genus Klenzea:
 Klenzea lycopodioides Sch.Bip. accepted as Dolichothrix ericoides (Lam.) Hilliard & B.L.Burtt, indigenous

Lachnospermum 
Genus Lachnospermum:
 Lachnospermum fasciculatum (Thunb.) Baill. endemic
 Lachnospermum imbricatum (P.J.Bergius) Hilliard, endemic
 Lachnospermum umbellatum (L.f.) Pillans, endemic

Lactuca 
Genus Lactuca:
 Lactuca capensis Thunb. accepted as Lactuca inermis Forssk.
 Lactuca dregeana DC. endemic
 Lactuca indica L.  not indigenous
 Lactuca inermis Forssk. indigenous
 Lactuca serriola L.  not indigenous
 Lactuca tysonii (E.Phillips) C.Jeffrey, endemic

Laevicarpa 
Genus Laevicarpa:
 Laevicarpa kolbei (Bolus) Koekemoer, ined. accepted as Disparago kolbei (Bolus) Hutch. endemic

Laggera 
Genus Laggera:
 Laggera crispata (Vahl) Hepper & J.R.I.Wood, indigenous
 Laggera decurrens (Vahl) Hepper & J.R.I.Wood, indigenous

Lamprocephalus 
Genus Lamprocephalus:
 Lamprocephalus montanus B.Nord. endemic

Langebergia 
Genus Langebergia:
 Langebergia canescens (DC.) Anderb. endemic

Lapsana 
Genus Lapsana:
 Lapsana communis L.  not indigenous, invasive

Lasiopogon 
Genus Lasiopogon:
 Lasiopogon brachypterus O.Hoffm. ex Zahlbr. endemic
 Lasiopogon debilis (Thunb.) Hilliard, endemic
 Lasiopogon glomerulatus (Harv.) Hilliard, indigenous
 Lasiopogon micropoides DC. indigenous
 Lasiopogon minutus (B.Nord.) Hilliard & B.L.Burtt, endemic
 Lasiopogon muscoides (Desf.) DC. indigenous
 Lasiopogon ponticulus Hilliard, indigenous

Lasiopus 
Genus Lasiopus:
 Lasiopus viridifolius DC. var. hisutus DC. accepted as Gerbera viridifolia (DC.) Sch.Bip. indigenous

Lasiospermum 
Genus Lasiospermum:
 Lasiospermum bipinnatum (Thunb.) Druce, indigenous
 Lasiospermum brachyglossum DC. indigenous
 Lasiospermum erectum (Lam.) Druce, accepted as Lasiospermum pedunculare Lag.
 Lasiospermum eriospermum (Pers.) G.Don, accepted as Lasiospermum pedunculare Lag.
 Lasiospermum pedunculare Lag. endemic
 Lasiospermum poterioides Hutch. endemic

Launaea 
Genus Launaea:
 Launaea intybacea (Jacq.) Beauverd, indigenous
 Launaea nana (Baker) Chiov. indigenous
 Launaea rarifolia (Oliv. & Hiern) Boulos, indigenous
 Launaea rarifolia (Oliv. & Hiern) Boulos var. rarifolia, indigenous
 Launaea sarmentosa (Willd.) Sch.Bip. ex Kuntze, indigenous

Lepidostephium 
Genus Lepidostephium:
 Lepidostephium asteroides (Bolus & Schltr.) Kroner, endemic
 Lepidostephium denticulatum Oliv. endemic

Leptilon 
Genus Leptilon:
 Leptilon bonariensis (L.) Small, accepted as Conyza bonariensis (L.) Cronquist
 Leptilon linifolium (Willd.) Small, accepted as Conyza bonariensis (L.) Cronquist

Leucanthemum 
Genus Leucanthemum:
 Leucanthemum vulgare Lam.  not indigenous

Leucoptera 
Genus Leucoptera:
 Leucoptera nodosa (Thunb.) B.Nord. endemic
 Leucoptera oppositifolia B.Nord. endemic
 Leucoptera subcarnosa B.Nord. endemic

Leysera 
Genus Leysera:
 Leysera gnaphalodes (L.) L. indigenous
 Leysera tenella DC. indigenous

Lidbeckia 
Genus Lidbeckia:
 Lidbeckia lobata Thunb. accepted as Lidbeckia quinqueloba (L.f.) Cass.
 Lidbeckia pectinata P.J.Bergius, endemic
 Lidbeckia pinnata J.C.Manning & Helme, indigenous
 Lidbeckia quinqueloba (L.f.) Cass. endemic

Linzia 
Genus Linzia:
 Linzia gerberiformis (Oliv. & Hiern) H.Rob. indigenous
 Linzia gerberiformis (Oliv. & Hiern) H.Rob. subsp. macrocyanus (O.Hoffm.) Isawumi, accepted as Linzia gerberiformis (Oliv. & Hiern) H.Rob. indigenous
 Linzia glabra Steetz, indigenous

Litogyne 
Genus Litogyne:
 Litogyne gariepina (DC.) Anderb. indigenous

Lopholaena 
Genus Lopholaena:
 Lopholaena cneorifolia (DC.) S.Moore, indigenous
 Lopholaena coriifolia (Sond.) E.Phillips & C.A.Sm. indigenous
 Lopholaena disticha (N.E.Br.) S.Moore, indigenous
 Lopholaena dregeana DC. endemic
 Lopholaena festiva Brusse, endemic
 Lopholaena longipes (Harv.) Thell. endemic
 Lopholaena platyphylla Benth. indigenous
 Lopholaena segmentata (Oliv.) S.Moore, indigenous

Macledium 
Genus Macledium:
 Macledium latifolium (DC.) S.Ortiz, endemic
 Macledium pretoriense (C.A.Sm.) S.Ortiz, endemic
 Macledium relhanioides (Less.) S.Ortiz, endemic
 Macledium speciosum (DC.) S.Ortiz, endemic
 Macledium spinosum (L.) S.Ortiz, endemic
 Macledium zeyheri (Sond.) S.Ortiz, indigenous
 Macledium zeyheri (Sond.) S.Ortiz subsp. argyrophyllum (Oliv.) S.Ortiz, endemic
 Macledium zeyheri (Sond.) S.Ortiz subsp. thyrsiflorum (Klatt) Netnou, endemic
 Macledium zeyheri (Sond.) S.Ortiz subsp. zeyheri, indigenous

Macowania 
Genus Macowania:
 Macowania conferta (Benth.) E.Phillips, endemic
 Macowania corymbosa M.D.Hend. endemic
 Macowania deflexa Hilliard & B.L.Burtt, endemic
 Macowania glandulosa N.E.Br. endemic
 Macowania hamata Hilliard & Burtt, endemic
 Macowania pinifolia (N.E.Br.) Kroner, indigenous
 Macowania pulvinaris N.E.Br. indigenous
 Macowania revoluta Oliv. endemic
 Macowania sororis Compton, indigenous
 Macowania tenuifolia M.D.Hend. endemic

Mairia 
Genus Mairia:
 Mairia burchellii DC. endemic
 Mairia coriacea Bolus, endemic
 Mairia corymbosa Harv. accepted as Zyrphelis corymbosa (Harv.) Kuntze
 Mairia crenata (Thunb.) Nees, endemic
 Mairia decumbens Schltr. accepted as Zyrphelis decumbens (Schltr.) G.L.Nesom
 Mairia ecklonis (DC.) Sond. accepted as Zyrphelis ecklonis (DC.) Kuntze subsp. ecklonis
 Mairia foliosa Harv. accepted as Zyrphelis foliosa (Harv.) Kuntze
 Mairia hirsuta DC. accepted as Mairia purpurata (L.) Goldblatt & J.C.Manning, endemic
 Mairia lasiocarpa DC. accepted as Zyrphelis lasiocarpa (DC.) Kuntze
 Mairia microcephala (Less.) DC. accepted as Zyrphelis microcephala (Less.) Nees subsp. microcephala
 Mairia montana Schltr. accepted as Zyrphelis montana (Schltr.) G.L.Nesom
 Mairia perezioides (Less.) Nees, accepted as Zyrphelis pilosella (Thunb.) Kuntze
 Mairia petiolata Zinnecker, indigenous
 Mairia purpurata (L.) Goldblatt & J.C.Manning, endemic
 Mairia robusta (Zinnecker) J.C.Manning & Goldblatt, indigenous
 Mairia taxifolia (L.) DC. accepted as Zyrphelis taxifolia (L.) Nees

Mantisalca 
Genus Mantisalca:
 Mantisalca salmantica (L.) Briq. & Cavill.  not indigenous

Marasmodes 
Genus Marasmodes:
 Marasmodes beyersiana S.Ortiz, endemic
 Marasmodes defoliata S.Ortiz, endemic
 Marasmodes dummeri Bolus ex Hutch. endemic
 Marasmodes fasciculata S.Ortiz, endemic
 Marasmodes macrocephala S.Ortiz, endemic
 Marasmodes oligocephala DC. endemic
 Marasmodes oubinae S.Ortiz, endemic
 Marasmodes polycephala DC. endemic
 Marasmodes reflexa S.Ortiz, endemic
 Marasmodes schlechteri Magee & J.C.Manning, indigenous
 Marasmodes spinosa S.Ortiz, endemic
 Marasmodes trifida S.Ortiz, endemic
 Marasmodes undulata Compton, endemic

Marsea 
Genus Marsea:
 Marsea bonariensis (L.) V.M.Badillo, accepted as Conyza bonariensis (L.) Cronquist
 Marsea canadensis (L.) V.M.Badillo, accepted as Conyza canadensis (L.) Cronquist
 Marsea chilensis (Spreng.) V.M.Badillo, accepted as Conyza chilensis Spreng.

Matricaria 
Genus Matricaria:
 Matricaria andreae E.Phillips, accepted as Cotula andreae (E.Phillips) K.Bremer & Humphries
 Matricaria nigellifolia DC. var. nigellifolia, accepted as Cotula nigellifolia (DC.) K.Bremer & Humphries var. nigellifolia
 Matricaria nigellifolia DC. var. tenuior DC. accepted as Cotula nigellifolia (DC.) K.Bremer & Humphries var. tenuior (DC.) P.P.J.Herman

Melanthera 
Genus Melanthera:
 Melanthera biflora (L.) Wild,  not indigenous
 Melanthera scandens (Schumach. & Thonn.) Roberty subsp. dregei (DC.) Wild,  not indigenous
 Melanthera triternata (Klatt) Wild,  not indigenous

Mesogramma 
Genus Mesogramma:
 Mesogramma apiifolium DC. indigenous

Metalasia 
Genus Metalasia:
 Metalasia acuta P.O.Karis, endemic
 Metalasia adunca Less. endemic
 Metalasia agathosmoides Pillans, endemic
 Metalasia albescens P.O.Karis, endemic
 Metalasia alfredii Pillans, endemic
 Metalasia aurea D.Don, endemic
 Metalasia bodkinii L.Bolus, endemic
 Metalasia brevifolia (Lam.) Levyns, endemic
 Metalasia calcicola P.O.Karis, endemic
 Metalasia capitata (Lam.) Less. endemic
 Metalasia cephalotes (Thunb.) Less. endemic
 Metalasia compacta Zeyh. ex Sch.Bip. endemic
 Metalasia confusa Pillans, endemic
 Metalasia cymbifolia Harv. endemic
 Metalasia densa (Lam.) P.O.Karis, indigenous
 Metalasia distans (Schrank) DC. endemic
 Metalasia divergens (Thunb.) D.Don, indigenous
 Metalasia divergens (Thunb.) D.Don subsp. divergens, endemic
 Metalasia divergens (Thunb.) D.Don subsp. fusca P.O.Karis, endemic
 Metalasia dregeana DC. endemic
 Metalasia eburnea Bengtson & P.O.Karis, endemic
 Metalasia erectifolia Pillans, endemic
 Metalasia erubescens DC. endemic
 Metalasia fastigiata (Thunb.) D.Don, endemic
 Metalasia formosa Bengtson & P.O.Karis, endemic
 Metalasia galpinii L.Bolus, endemic
 Metalasia helmei P.O.Karis, endemic
 Metalasia humilis P.O.Karis, endemic
 Metalasia inversa P.O.Karis, endemic
 Metalasia juniperoides Pillans, endemic
 Metalasia lichtensteinii Less. endemic
 Metalasia luteola P.O.Karis, endemic
 Metalasia massonii S.Moore, endemic
 Metalasia montana P.O.Karis, endemic
 Metalasia muraltiifolia DC. endemic
 Metalasia muricata (L.) D.Don, endemic
 Metalasia namaquana P.O.Karis & Helme, indigenous
 Metalasia octoflora DC. endemic
 Metalasia oligocephala P.O.Karis, endemic
 Metalasia pallida Bolus, endemic
 Metalasia phillipsii L.Bolus, indigenous
 Metalasia phillipsii L.Bolus subsp. incurva (Pillans) P.O.Karis, endemic
 Metalasia phillipsii L.Bolus subsp. phillipsii, endemic
 Metalasia plicata P.O.Karis, endemic
 Metalasia pulchella (Cass.) P.O.Karis, endemic
 Metalasia pulcherrima Less. [2], indigenous
 Metalasia pulcherrima Less. forma pallescens (Harv.) P.O.Karis, endemic
 Metalasia pulcherrima Less. forma pulcherrima, endemic
 Metalasia pungens D.Don, endemic
 Metalasia quinqueflora DC. endemic
 Metalasia rhoderoides T.M.Salter, endemic
 Metalasia riparia T.M.Salter, endemic
 Metalasia rogersii S.Moore, endemic
 Metalasia seriphiifolia DC. endemic
 Metalasia serrata P.O.Karis, endemic
 Metalasia serrulata P.O.Karis, endemic
 Metalasia strictifolia Bolus, endemic
 Metalasia tenuifolia DC. endemic
 Metalasia tenuis P.O.Karis, endemic
 Metalasia tricolor Pillans, endemic
 Metalasia tristis Bengtson & P.O.Karis, endemic
 Metalasia trivialis P.O.Karis, endemic
 Metalasia umbelliformis P.O.Karis, endemic

Microglossa 
Genus Microglossa:
 Microglossa caffrorum (Less.) Grau, endemic
 Microglossa mespilifolia (Less.) B.L.Rob. endemic

Mikania 
Genus Mikania:
 Mikania capensis DC. indigenous
 Mikania natalensis DC. indigenous

Mikaniopsis 
Genus Mikaniopsis:
 Mikaniopsis cissampelina (DC.) C.Jeffrey, indigenous

Minurothamnus 
Genus Minurothamnus:
 Minurothamnus phagnaloides DC. accepted as Heterolepis aliena (L.f.) Druce

Monoculus 
Genus Monoculus:
 Monoculus hyoseroides (DC.) B.Nord. accepted as Osteospermum hyoseroides (DC.) Norl. endemic
 Monoculus monstrosus (Burm.f.) B.Nord. accepted as Osteospermum monstrosum (Burm.f.) J.C.Manning & Goldblatt, indigenous

Montanoa 
Genus Montanoa:
 Montanoa bipinnatifida (Kunth) K.Koch,  not indigenous
 Montanoa hibiscifolia Benth.  not indigenous, invasive

Monticapra 
Genus Monticapra:
 Monticapra barbata (Koekemoer) Koekemoer, ined. accepted as Disparago barbata Koekemoer, endemic
 Monticapra gongylodes (Koekemoer) Koekemoer, ined. accepted as Disparago gongylodes Koekemoer, endemic
 Monticapra pilosa (Koekemoer) Koekemoer, ined. accepted as Disparago pilosa Koekemoer, endemic

Morysia 
Genus Morysia:
 Morysia acerosa DC. accepted as Phymaspermum acerosum (DC.) Kallersjo, indigenous

Myrovernix 
Genus Myrovernix:
 Myrovernix glandulosus Koekemoer, ined. accepted as Elytropappus glandulosus Less. endemic
 Myrovernix gnaphaloides Koekemoer, ined. accepted as Elytropappus gnaphaloides (L.) Levyns, endemic
 Myrovernix intricata (Levyns) Koekemoer, ined. accepted as Stoebe intricata Levyns, endemic
 Myrovernix muricata (Spreng. ex Sch.Bip.) Koekemoer, ined. accepted as Stoebe muricata Spreng. ex Sch.Bip. endemic
 Myrovernix scaber (L.f.) Koekemoer, ined. accepted as Stoebe scabra L.f. endemic

Myxopappus 
Genus Myxopappus:
 Myxopappus acutilobus (DC.) Kallersjo, indigenous

Namibithamnus 
Genus Namibithamnus:
 Namibithamnus obionifolius (O.Hoffm.) H.Rob. Skvarla & V.A.Funk, indigenous

Nephrotheca 
Genus Nephrotheca:
 Nephrotheca ilicifolia (L.) B.Nord. & Kallersjo, accepted as Osteospermum ilicifolium L. endemic

Nestlera 
Genus Nestlera:
 Nestlera biennis (Jacq.) Spreng. endemic

Nicolasia 
Genus Nicolasia:
 Nicolasia nitens (O.Hoffm.) Eyles, indigenous
 Nicolasia nitens (O.Hoffm.) Eyles var.nitens, indigenous
 Nicolasia stenoptera (O.Hoffm.) Merxm. indigenous
 Nicolasia stenoptera (O.Hoffm.) Merxm. subsp.stenoptera, indigenous

Nidorella 
Genus Nidorella:
 Nidorella aegyptiaca (L.) J.C.Manning & Goldblatt, accepted as Conyza aegyptiaca (L.) Aiton, indigenous
 Nidorella agria Hilliard, indigenous
 Nidorella amplexicaulis DC. accepted as Nidorella undulata (Thunb.) Sond. ex Harv. indigenous
 Nidorella angustifolia O.Hoffm. accepted as Nidorella anomala Steetz, indigenous
 Nidorella anomala Steetz, indigenous
 Nidorella attenuata (DC.) J.C.Manning & Goldblatt, accepted as Conyza attenuata DC. indigenous
 Nidorella auriculata DC. indigenous
 Nidorella auriculata DC. subsp.polycephala (DC.) Wild, accepted as Nidorella auriculata DC. indigenous
 Nidorella densifolia O.Hoffm. accepted as Nidorella resedifolia DC. subsp.resedifolia, indigenous
 Nidorella depauperata Harv. accepted as Nidorella anomala Steetz, indigenous
 Nidorella diversifolia Spreng. ex Steetz, accepted as Nidorella auriculata DC. indigenous
 Nidorella foetida (L.) DC. endemic
 Nidorella hirta DC. accepted as Nidorella resedifolia DC. subsp.resedifolia, indigenous
 Nidorella hottentotica DC. indigenous
 Nidorella hottentotica DC. var.lanata Harv. accepted as Nidorella hottentotica DC. indigenous
 Nidorella hyssopifolia DC. accepted as Nidorella foetida (L.) DC. indigenous
 Nidorella hyssopifolia DC. var.glabrata DC. accepted as Nidorella foetida (L.) DC. indigenous
 Nidorella ivifolia (L.) J.C.Manning & Goldblatt, accepted as Conyza scabrida DC. indigenous
 Nidorella kraussii (Sch.Bip. ex Walp.) Harv. accepted as Nidorella auriculata DC. indigenous
 Nidorella krookii O.Hoffm. accepted as Nidorella resedifolia DC. subsp.resedifolia, indigenous
 Nidorella linifolia DC. endemic
 Nidorella longifolia DC. accepted as Nidorella undulata (Thunb.) Sond. ex Harv. indigenous
 Nidorella membranifolia Steetz, accepted as Nidorella microcephala Steetz, indigenous
 Nidorella microcephala Steetz, indigenous
 Nidorella obovata DC. accepted as Nidorella auriculata DC. indigenous
 Nidorella obscura (DC.) J.C.Manning & Goldblatt, accepted as Conyza obscura DC. indigenous
 Nidorella pinnata (L.f.) J.C.Manning & Goldblatt, accepted as Conyza pinnata (L.f.) Kuntze, indigenous
 Nidorella pinnatifida (Thunb.) J.C.Manning & Goldblatt, accepted as Conyza pinnatifida (Thunb.) Less. endemic
 Nidorella pinnatilobata DC. accepted as Nidorella resedifolia DC. subsp.resedifolia, indigenous
 Nidorella podocephala (DC.) J.C.Manning & Goldblatt, accepted as Conyza podocephala DC. indigenous
 Nidorella polycephala DC. accepted as Nidorella auriculata DC. indigenous
 Nidorella punctulata DC. accepted as Psiadia punctulata (DC.) Vatke, indigenous
 Nidorella rapunculoides DC. accepted as Nidorella resedifolia DC. subsp.resedifolia, indigenous
 Nidorella resedifolia DC. indigenous
 Nidorella resedifolia DC. subsp.microcephala (Steetz) Wild, accepted as Nidorella microcephala Steetz, indigenous
 Nidorella resedifolia DC. subsp.resedifolia, indigenous
 Nidorella resedifolia DC. var.subvillosa Merxm. accepted as Nidorella resedifolia DC. subsp.resedifolia, indigenous
 Nidorella senecionea DC. accepted as Nidorella auriculata DC. indigenous
 Nidorella senecionea DC. var.albanensis DC. accepted as Nidorella auriculata DC. indigenous
 Nidorella solidaginea DC. accepted as Nidorella resedifolia DC. subsp.resedifolia, indigenous
 Nidorella sprengelii (Sch.Bip. ex Walp.) Harv. accepted as Nidorella auriculata DC. indigenous
 Nidorella tongensis Hilliard, endemic
 Nidorella ulmifolia (Burm.f.) J.C.Manning & Goldblatt, accepted as Conyza ulmifolia (Burm.f.) Kuntze, indigenous
 Nidorella undulata (Thunb.) Sond. ex Harv. indigenous

Nolletia 
Genus Nolletia:
 Nolletia annetjieae P.P.J.Herman, indigenous
 Nolletia arenosa O.Hoffm. accepted as Nolletia chrysocomoides (Desf.) Cass. ex Less. indigenous
 Nolletia ciliaris (DC.) Steetz, indigenous
 Nolletia ericoides Merxm. accepted as Nolletia ciliaris (DC.) Steetz
 Nolletia gariepina (DC.) Mattf. indigenous
 Nolletia jeanettae P.P.J.Herman, endemic
 Nolletia rarifolia (Turcz.) Steetz, endemic
 Nolletia ruderalis Hilliard, indigenous
 Nolletia vanhoepeniae P.P.J.Herman, indigenous

Norlindhia 
Genus Norlindhia:
 Norlindhia amplectens (Harv.) B.Nord. accepted as Osteospermum amplectens (Harv.) Norl. present
 Norlindhia breviradiata (Norl.) B.Nord. accepted as Osteospermum breviradiatum Norl. indigenous

Oedera 
Genus Oedera:
 Oedera capensis (L.) Druce, endemic
 Oedera conferta (Hutch.) Anderb. & K.Bremer, endemic
 Oedera epaleacea Beyers, endemic
 Oedera foveolata (K.Bremer) Anderb. & K.Bremer, endemic
 Oedera genistifolia (L.) Anderb. & K.Bremer, endemic
 Oedera hirta Thunb. endemic
 Oedera imbricata Lam. endemic
 Oedera intermedia DC. accepted as Oedera imbricata Lam. present
 Oedera laevis DC. endemic
 Oedera muirii C.A.Sm. accepted as Oedera laevis DC. present
 Oedera multipunctata (DC.) Anderb. & K.Bremer, endemic
 Oedera nordenstamii (K.Bremer) Anderb. & K.Bremer, endemic
 Oedera resinifera (K.Bremer) Anderb. & K.Bremer, endemic
 Oedera sedifolia (DC.) Anderb. & K.Bremer, endemic
 Oedera silicicola (K.Bremer) Anderb. & K.Bremer, endemic
 Oedera squarrosa (L.) Anderb. & K.Bremer, endemic
 Oedera steyniae (L.Bolus) Anderb. & K.Bremer, endemic
 Oedera uniflora (L.f.) Anderb. & K.Bremer, endemic
 Oedera viscosa (L'Her.) Anderb. & K.Bremer, endemic

Oldenburgia 
Genus Oldenburgia:
 Oldenburgia grandis (Thunb.) Baill. endemic
 Oldenburgia intermedia Bond, endemic
 Oldenburgia papionum DC. endemic
 Oldenburgia paradoxa Less. endemic

Oligocarpus 
Genus Oligocarpus:
 Oligocarpus acanthospermus (DC.) Bolus, accepted as Osteospermum acanthospermum (DC.) Norl. indigenous
 Oligocarpus calendulaceus (L.f.) Less. accepted APNI  but Plants of the World Online gives Osteospermum calendulaceum L.f. as the accepted name - endemic.

Oligoglossa 
Genus Oligoglossa:
 Oligoglossa acicularis E.Mey. ex DC. accepted as Phymaspermum aciculare (E.Mey. ex Harv.) Benth. & Hook. ex B.D.Jacks. indigenous

Oligothrix 
Genus Oligothrix:
 Oligothrix gracilis DC. endemic

Oncosiphon 
Genus Oncosiphon:
 Oncosiphon africanus (P.J.Bergius) Kallersjo, endemic
 Oncosiphon glabratus (Thunb.) Kallersjo, accepted as Oncosiphon africanus (P.J.Bergius) Kallersjo, present
 Oncosiphon grandiflorus (Thunb.) Kallersjo, indigenous
 Oncosiphon intermedius (Hutch.) Kallersjo, endemic
 Oncosiphon piluliferus (L.f.) Kallersjo, indigenous
 Oncosiphon sabulosus (Wolley-Dod) Kallersjo, endemic
 Oncosiphon schlechteri (Bolus) Kallersjo, endemic
 Oncosiphon suffruticosus (L.) Kallersjo, indigenous

Oocephala 
Genus Oocephala:
 Oocephala centaureoides (Klatt) H.Rob. & Skvarla, indigenous
 Oocephala staehelinoides (Harv.) H.Rob. & Skvarla, endemic

Orbivestus 
Genus Orbivestus:
 Orbivestus cinerascens (Sch.Bip.) H.Rob. indigenous
 Orbivestus obionifolius (O.Hoffm.) J.C.Manning, accepted as Namibithamnus obionifolius (O.Hoffm.) H.Rob. Skvarla & V.A.Funk

Oreoleysera 
Genus Oreoleysera:
 Oreoleysera montana (Bolus) K.Bremer, endemic

Oresbia 
Genus Oresbia:
 Oresbia heterocarpa Cron & B.Nord. endemic

Osmitopsis 
Genus Osmitopsis:
 Osmitopsis afra (L.) K.Bremer, endemic
 Osmitopsis asteriscoides (P.J.Bergius) Less. endemic
 Osmitopsis dentata (Thunb.) K.Bremer, endemic
 Osmitopsis glabra K.Bremer, endemic
 Osmitopsis nana Schltr. endemic
 Osmitopsis osmitoides (Less.) K.Bremer, endemic
 Osmitopsis parvifolia (DC.) Hofmeyr, endemic
 Osmitopsis pinnatifida (DC.) K.Bremer, indigenous
 Osmitopsis pinnatifida (DC.) K.Bremer subsp.angustifolia (DC.) K.Bremer, endemic
 Osmitopsis pinnatifida (DC.) K.Bremer subsp.pinnatifida, endemic
 Osmitopsis pinnatifida (DC.) K.Bremer subsp.serrata K.Bremer, endemic
 Osmitopsis tenuis K.Bremer, endemic

Osteospermum 
Genus Osteospermum:
 Osteospermum acanthospermum (DC.) Norl. endemic
 Osteospermum aciphyllum DC. endemic
 Osteospermum acutifolium (Hutch.) Norl. accepted as Dimorphotheca acutifolia Hutch. present
 Osteospermum amplectens (Harv.) Norl. endemic
 Osteospermum armatum Norl. indigenous
 Osteospermum asperulum (DC.) Norl. endemic
 Osteospermum attenuatum Hilliard & B.L.Burtt, endemic
 Osteospermum auriculatum (S.Moore) Norl. endemic
 Osteospermum australe B.Nord. endemic
 Osteospermum barberae (Harv.) Norl. accepted as Dimorphotheca barberae Harv. present
 Osteospermum bidens Thunb. endemic
 Osteospermum bolusii (Compton) Norl. endemic
 Osteospermum breviradiatum Norl. indigenous
 Osteospermum burttianum B.Nord. endemic
 Osteospermum calcicola (J.C.Manning & Snijman) J.C.Manning & Goldblatt, endemic
 Osteospermum calendulaceum L.f. endemic
 Osteospermum caulescens Harv. accepted as Dimorphotheca caulescens Harv. present
 Osteospermum ciliatum P.J.Bergius, endemic
 Osteospermum clandestinum (Less.) Norl. accepted as Osteospermum monstrosum (Burm.f.) J.C.Manning & Goldblatt, indigenous
 Osteospermum connatum DC. endemic
 Osteospermum corymbosum L. endemic
 Osteospermum crassifolium (O.Hoffm.) Norl. indigenous
 Osteospermum dentatum Burm.f. endemic
 Osteospermum dregei (DC.) Norl. var.dregei, accepted as Dimorphotheca dregei DC. var.dregei, present
 Osteospermum dregei (DC.) Norl. var.reticulatum Norl. accepted as Dimorphotheca dregei DC. var.reticulata (Norl.) B.Nord. endemic
 Osteospermum ecklonis (DC.) Norl. accepted as Dimorphotheca ecklonis DC. present
 Osteospermum elsieae Norl. endemic
 Osteospermum fruticosum (L.) Norl. accepted as Dimorphotheca fruticosa (L.) Less. present
 Osteospermum glabrum N.E.Br. endemic
 Osteospermum grandidentatum DC. indigenous
 Osteospermum grandiflorum DC. endemic
 Osteospermum hafstroemii Norl. endemic
 Osteospermum herbaceum L.f. endemic
 Osteospermum hirsutum Thunb. endemic
 Osteospermum hispidum Harv. indigenous
 Osteospermum hispidum Harv. var.hispidum, endemic
 Osteospermum hispidum Harv. var.viride Norl. endemic
 Osteospermum hyoseroides (DC.) Norl. endemic
 Osteospermum ilicifolium L. endemic
 Osteospermum imbricatum L. indigenous
 Osteospermum imbricatum L. subsp.imbricatum, endemic
 Osteospermum imbricatum L. subsp.nervatum (DC.) Norl. var.helichrysoides, endemic
 Osteospermum imbricatum L. subsp.nervatum (DC.) Norl. var.nervatum, endemic
 Osteospermum incanum Burm.f. subsp.incanum, indigenous
 Osteospermum incanum Burm.f. subsp.subcanescens (DC.) J.C.Manning & Goldblatt, endemic
 Osteospermum jucundum (E.Phillips) Norl. accepted as Dimorphotheca jucunda E.Phillips, present
 Osteospermum junceum P.J.Bergius, endemic
 Osteospermum karrooicum (Bolus) Norl. indigenous
 Osteospermum lanceolatum DC. endemic
 Osteospermum leptolobum (Harv.) Norl. endemic
 Osteospermum microcarpum (Harv.) Norl. indigenous
 Osteospermum microcarpum (Harv.) Norl. subsp.microcarpum, indigenous
 Osteospermum microphyllum DC. indigenous
 Osteospermum moniliferum L. indigenous
 Osteospermum moniliferum L. subsp.canescens (DC.) J.C.Manning & Goldblatt, indigenous
 Osteospermum moniliferum L. subsp.moniliferum, indigenous
 Osteospermum moniliferum L. subsp.pisiferum (L.) J.C.Manning & Goldblatt, endemic
 Osteospermum moniliferum L. subsp.rotundatum (DC.) J.C.Manning & Goldblatt, indigenous
 Osteospermum moniliferum L. subsp.septentrionale (Norl.) J.C.Manning & Goldblatt, indigenous
 Osteospermum moniliferum L. var.pisiferum (L.) Harv. accepted as Osteospermum moniliferum L. subsp.pisiferum (L.) J.C.Manning & Goldblatt, endemic
 Osteospermum moniliferum L. var.rotundatum (DC.) Harv. accepted as Osteospermum moniliferum L. subsp.rotundatum (DC.) J.C.Manning & Goldblatt, indigenous
 Osteospermum monstrosum (Burm.f.) J.C.Manning & Goldblatt, indigenous
 Osteospermum muricatum E.Mey. ex DC. indigenous
 Osteospermum muricatum E.Mey. ex DC. subsp.muricatum, indigenous
 Osteospermum nordenstamii J.C.Manning & Goldblatt, endemic
 Osteospermum norlindhianum J.C.Manning & Goldblatt, endemic
 Osteospermum oppositifolium (Aiton) Norl. indigenous
 Osteospermum pinnatilobatum Norl. endemic
 Osteospermum pinnatum (Thunb.) Norl. accepted as Dimorphotheca pinnata (Thunb.) Harv. indigenous
 Osteospermum pinnatum (Thunb.) Norl. var.breve Norl. accepted as Dimorphotheca pinnata (Thunb.) Harv. var.breve (Norl.) J.C.Manning, indigenous
 Osteospermum pisiferum L. accepted as Osteospermum moniliferum L. subsp.pisiferum (L.) J.C.Manning & Goldblatt, endemic
 Osteospermum pisiferum L. var.canescens DC. accepted as Osteospermum moniliferum L. subsp.canescens (DC.) J.C.Manning & Goldblatt, indigenous
 Osteospermum polycephalum (DC.) Norl. indigenous
 Osteospermum polygaloides L. indigenous
 Osteospermum polygaloides L. var.latifolium Norl. endemic
 Osteospermum polygaloides L. var.polygaloides, endemic
 Osteospermum potbergense A.R.Wood & B.Nord. endemic
 Osteospermum pterigoideum Klatt, endemic
 Osteospermum pulchrum Norl. accepted as Dimorphotheca acutifolia Hutch. present
 Osteospermum pyrifolium Norl. endemic
 Osteospermum rigidum Aiton, indigenous
 Osteospermum rigidum Aiton var.elegans (Bolus) Norl. endemic
 Osteospermum rigidum Aiton var.rigidum, endemic
 Osteospermum rosulatum Norl. endemic
 Osteospermum rotundatum DC. accepted as Osteospermum moniliferum L. subsp.rotundatum (DC.) J.C.Manning & Goldblatt, indigenous
 Osteospermum rotundifolium (DC.) Norl. endemic
 Osteospermum scabrum Thunb. endemic
 Osteospermum scariosum DC. var.integrifolium (Harv.) Norl. endemic
 Osteospermum scariosum DC. var.scariosum, indigenous
 Osteospermum sinuatum (DC.) Norl. indigenous
 Osteospermum sinuatum (DC.) Norl. var.lineare (Harv.) Norl. endemic
 Osteospermum sinuatum (DC.) Norl. var.sinuatum, indigenous
 Osteospermum spathulatum (DC.) Norl. endemic
 Osteospermum spinescens Thunb. indigenous
 Osteospermum spinigerum (Norl.) Norl. endemic
 Osteospermum spinosum L. indigenous
 Osteospermum spinosum L. var.runcinatum P.J.Bergius, endemic
 Osteospermum spinosum L. var.spinosum, endemic
 Osteospermum striatum Burtt Davy, endemic
 Osteospermum subcanescens DC. accepted as Osteospermum incanum Burm.f. subsp.subcanescens (DC.) J.C.Manning & Goldblatt, endemic
 Osteospermum subulatum DC. endemic
 Osteospermum thodei Markotter, indigenous
 Osteospermum thymelaeoides DC. accepted as Phymaspermum thymelaeoides (DC.) Magee & Ruiters, indigenous
 Osteospermum tomentosum (L.f.) Norl. endemic
 Osteospermum triquetrum L.f. endemic
 Osteospermum wallianum Norl. accepted as Dimorphotheca walliana (Norl.) B.Nord. endemic

Othonna 
Genus Othonna:
 Othonna abrotanifolia (Harv.) Druce, accepted as Othonna daucifolia J.C.Manning & Goldblatt, endemic
 Othonna alba Compton, accepted as Crassothonna alba (Compton) B.Nord. endemic
 Othonna amplexifolia DC. accepted as Othonna perfoliata (L.f.) Jacq. indigenous
 Othonna arborescens L. endemic
 Othonna arbuscula (Thunb.) Sch.Bip. endemic
 Othonna armiana Van Jaarsv. endemic
 Othonna auriculifolia Licht. ex Less. endemic
 Othonna bulbosa L. endemic
 Othonna burttii B.Nord. indigenous
 Othonna cacalioides L.f. endemic
 Othonna cakilifolia DC. endemic
 Othonna capensis L.H.Bailey, accepted as Crassothonna capensis (L.H.Bailey) B.Nord. endemic
 Othonna carnosa Less. accepted as Crassothonna cacalioides (L.f.) B.Nord. indigenous
 Othonna carnosa Less. var.discoidea Oliv. accepted as Crassothonna discoidea (Oilv. in Hook.) B.Nord. endemic
 Othonna chromochaeta (DC.) Sch.Bip. endemic
 Othonna ciliata L.f. endemic
 Othonna clavifolia Marloth, accepted as Crassothonna clavifolia (Marloth) B.Nord. indigenous
 Othonna coronopifolia L. endemic
 Othonna crassicaulis Compton, accepted as Crassothonna protecta (Dinter) B.Nord. indigenous
 Othonna crassifolia Harv. accepted as Crassothonna capensis (L.H.Bailey) B.Nord. indigenous
 Othonna cremnophila B.Nord. & Van Jaarsv. endemic
 Othonna cuneata DC. endemic
 Othonna cyclophylla Merxm. indigenous
 Othonna cylindrica (Lam.) DC. accepted as Crassothonna cylindrica (Lam.) B.Nord. indigenous
 Othonna daucifolia J.C.Manning & Goldblatt, endemic
 Othonna dentata L. endemic
 Othonna digitata L. endemic
 Othonna divaricata Hutch. endemic
 Othonna diversifolia (DC.) Sch.Bip. endemic
 Othonna eriocarpa (DC.) Sch.Bip. endemic
 Othonna euphorbioides Hutch. endemic
 Othonna filicaulis Jacq. accepted as Othonna perfoliata (L.f.) Jacq. present
 Othonna floribunda Schltr. accepted as Crassothonna floribunda (Schltr.) B.Nord. endemic
 Othonna frutescens L. endemic
 Othonna furcata (Lindl.) Druce, indigenous
 Othonna graveolens O.Hoffm. indigenous
 Othonna gymnodiscus (DC.) Sch.Bip. endemic
 Othonna hallii B.Nord. endemic
 Othonna hederifolia B.Nord. endemic
 Othonna herrei Pillans, endemic
 Othonna heterophylla L.f. endemic
 Othonna humilis Schltr. endemic
 Othonna incisa Harv. accepted as Othonna rosea Harv. endemic
 Othonna intermedia Compton, endemic
 Othonna lasiocarpa (DC.) Sch.Bip. indigenous
 Othonna lepidocaulis Schltr. endemic
 Othonna leptodactyla Harv. endemic
 Othonna lineariifolia (DC.) Sch.Bip. endemic
 Othonna lingua (Less.) Sch.Bip. accepted as Othonna bulbosa L. endemic
 Othonna lobata Schltr. endemic
 Othonna lyrata DC. endemic
 Othonna macrophylla DC. endemic
 Othonna macrosperma DC. endemic
 Othonna membranifolia DC. endemic
 Othonna mucronata Harv. endemic
 Othonna multicaulis Harv. endemic
 Othonna natalensis Sch.Bip. indigenous
 Othonna obtusiloba Harv. endemic
 Othonna oleracea Compton, endemic
 Othonna opima Merxm. accepted as Crassothonna opima (Merxm.) B.Nord. indigenous
 Othonna osteospermoides DC. endemic
 Othonna othonnites (L.) Druce, accepted as Crassothonna capensis (L.H.Bailey) B.Nord.
 Othonna ovalifolia Hutch. endemic
 Othonna pachypoda Hutch. endemic
 Othonna papaveroides Hutch. endemic
 Othonna parviflora P.J.Bergius, endemic
 Othonna patula Schltr. accepted as Crassothonna patula (Schltr.) B.Nord. endemic
 Othonna pavelkae Lavranos, endemic
 Othonna pavonia E.Mey. endemic
 Othonna perfoliata (L.f.) Jacq. indigenous
 Othonna petiolaris DC. endemic
 Othonna pinnata L.f. endemic
 Othonna pinnatilobata Sch.Bip. accepted as Othonna retrofracta Jacq. present
 Othonna pluridentata DC. endemic
 Othonna primulina DC. endemic
 Othonna protecta Dinter, accepted as Crassothonna protecta (Dinter) B.Nord. indigenous
 Othonna pteronioides Harv. endemic
 Othonna purpurascens Harv. endemic
 Othonna pygmaea Compton, endemic
 Othonna quercifolia DC. endemic
 Othonna quinquedentata Thunb. endemic
 Othonna quinqueradiata DC. endemic
 Othonna ramulosa DC. endemic
 Othonna rechingeri B.Nord. accepted as Crassothonna rechingeri (B.Nord.) B.Nord. endemic
 Othonna reticulata DC. endemic
 Othonna retrofracta Jacq. indigenous
 Othonna retrorsa DC. endemic
 Othonna retrorsa DC. var.spektakelensis (Compton) G.D.Rowley, accepted as Othonna retrorsa DC. endemic
 Othonna rhamnoides Sch.Bip. indigenous
 Othonna rosea Harv. endemic
 Othonna rotundifolia DC. endemic
 Othonna rufibarbis Harv. endemic
 Othonna sedifolia DC. accepted as Crassothonna sedifolia (DC.) B.Nord. indigenous
 Othonna sonchifolia DC. endemic
 Othonna sparsiflora (S.Moore) B.Nord. accepted as Crassothonna alba (Compton) B.Nord.
 Othonna spektakelensis Compton, accepted as Othonna retrorsa DC. present
 Othonna spinescens DC. endemic
 Othonna stenophylla Levyns, endemic
 Othonna taraxacoides (DC.) Sch.Bip. endemic
 Othonna tephrosioides Sond. endemic
 Othonna trinervia DC. endemic
 Othonna triplinervia DC. endemic
 Othonna umbelliformis DC. endemic
 Othonna undulosa (DC.) J.C.Manning & Goldblatt, indigenous
 Othonna viminea E.Mey. endemic
 Othonna zeyheri Sond. ex Harv. accepted as Othonna retrorsa DC. endemic

Oxylaena 
Genus Oxylaena:
 Oxylaena acicularis (Benth.) Anderb. accepted as Osteospermum scabrum Thunb. endemic

Parapolydora 
Genus Parapolydora:
 Parapolydora fastigiata (Oliv. & Hiern) H.Rob. indigenous
 Parapolydora gerrardii (Harv.) H.Rob. Skvarla & V.A.Funk, endemic

Parthenium 
Genus Parthenium:
 Parthenium hysterophorus L. not indigenous, invasive

Pechuel-loeschea 
Genus Pechuel-loeschea:
 Pechuel-loeschea leubnitziae (Kuntze) O.Hoffm. indigenous

Pegolettia 
Genus Pegolettia:
 Pegolettia baccaridifolia Less. endemic
 Pegolettia gariepina Anderb. indigenous
 Pegolettia lanceolata Harv. indigenous
 Pegolettia oxyodonta DC. indigenous
 Pegolettia retrofracta (Thunb.) Kies, indigenous
 Pegolettia senegalensis Cass. indigenous
 Pegolettia tenella DC. accepted as Pseudopegolettia tenella (DC.) H.Rob. Skvarla & V.A.Funk, indigenous
 Pegolettia tenuifolia Bolus, endemic

Pentanema 
Genus Pentanema:
 Pentanema indicum (L.) Y.Ling, not indigenous

Pentatrichia 
Genus Pentatrichia:
 Pentatrichia alata S.Moore, indigenous
 Pentatrichia avasmontana Merxm. accepted as Pentatrichia rehmii (Merxm.) Merxm. subsp.avasmontana (Merxm.) Klaassen & Kwembeya
 Pentatrichia integra (Compton) Klaassen & N.G.Bergh, endemic
 Pentatrichia kuntzei (O.Hoffm.) Klaassen & N.G.Bergh, endemic
 Pentatrichia petrosa Klatt, indigenous

Pentzia 
Genus Pentzia:
 Pentzia argentea Hutch. indigenous
 Pentzia athanasioides S.Moore, accepted as Phymaspermum athanasioides (S.Moore) Kallersjo, indigenous
 Pentzia bolusii Hutch. accepted as Pentzia incana (Thunb.) Kuntze, endemic
 Pentzia calcarea Kies, indigenous
 Pentzia cooperi Harv. indigenous
 Pentzia dentata (L.) Kuntze, endemic
 Pentzia elegans DC. endemic
 Pentzia globosa Less. indigenous
 Pentzia incana (Thunb.) Kuntze, indigenous
 Pentzia lanata Hutch. indigenous
 Pentzia monocephala S.Moore, indigenous
 Pentzia nana Burch. endemic
 Pentzia oppositifolia Magee, indigenous
 Pentzia peduncularis B.Nord. endemic
 Pentzia pinnatifida Oliv. accepted as Phymaspermum pinnatifidum (Oliv.) Kallersjo, indigenous
 Pentzia pinnatifida Oliv. var.chenoleoides Hutch. accepted as Phymaspermum acerosum (DC.) Kallersjo, indigenous
 Pentzia pinnatisecta Hutch. indigenous
 Pentzia punctata Harv. ex Hutch. indigenous
 Pentzia quinquefida (Thunb.) Less. endemic
 Pentzia sphaerocephala DC. indigenous
 Pentzia spinescens Less. indigenous
 Pentzia stellata (P.P.J.Herman) Magee, endemic
 Pentzia stenocephala Thell. accepted as Phymaspermum acerosum (DC.) Kallersjo, indigenous
 Pentzia tortuosa (DC.) Fenzl ex Harv. indigenous
 Pentzia trifida Schltr. ex Magee & J.C.Manning, indigenous
 Pentzia tysonii Thell. accepted as Phymaspermum woodii (Thell.) Kallersjo, indigenous
 Pentzia viridis Kies, endemic
 Pentzia woodii Thell. accepted as Phymaspermum woodii (Thell.) Kallersjo, indigenous

Perdicium 
Genus Perdicium:
 Perdicium capense L. endemic
 Perdicium leiocarpum DC. endemic

Petalacte 
Genus Petalacte:
 Petalacte coronata (L.) D.Don, endemic
 Petalacte epaleata Hilliard & B.L.Burtt, accepted as Anderbergia epaleata (Hilliard & B.L.Burtt) B.Nord. present
 Petalacte vlokii Hilliard, accepted as Anderbergia vlokii (Hilliard) B.Nord. present

Peyrousea 
Genus Peyrousea:
 Peyrousea umbellata (L.f.) Fourc. accepted as Schistostephium umbellatum (L.f.) K.Bremer & Humphries, present

Phaenocoma 
Genus Phaenocoma:
 Phaenocoma prolifera (L.) D.Don, endemic

Phaneroglossa 
Genus Phaneroglossa:
 Phaneroglossa bolusii (Oliv.) B.Nord. endemic

Philyrophyllum 
Genus Philyrophyllum:
 Philyrophyllum schinzii O.Hoffm. indigenous

Phymaspermum 
Genus Phymaspermum:
 Phymaspermum acerosum (DC.) Kallersjo, indigenous
 Phymaspermum aciculare (E.Mey. ex Harv.) Benth. & Hook. ex B.D.Jacks. indigenous
 Phymaspermum aphyllum Magee & Ruiters, endemic
 Phymaspermum appressum Bolus, endemic
 Phymaspermum argenteum Brusse, endemic
 Phymaspermum athanasioides (S.Moore) Kallersjo, indigenous
 Phymaspermum bolusii (Hutch.) Kallersjo, accepted as Phymaspermum athanasioides (S.Moore) Kallersjo, indigenous
 Phymaspermum comptonii Magee & Ruiters, indigenous
 Phymaspermum equisetoides Thell. accepted as Phymaspermum erubescens (Hutch.) Kallersjo, indigenous
 Phymaspermum erubescens (Hutch.) Kallersjo, endemic
 Phymaspermum junceum Less. accepted as Phymaspermum leptophyllum (DC.) Benth. & Hook. ex B.D.Jacks. indigenous
 Phymaspermum leptophyllum (DC.) Benth. & Hook. ex B.D.Jacks. endemic
 Phymaspermum montanum (Hutch.) Kallersjo, accepted as Phymaspermum athanasioides (S.Moore) Kallersjo, endemic
 Phymaspermum oppositifolium Magee & Ruiters, endemic
 Phymaspermum parvifolium (DC.) Benth. & Hook. ex B.D.Jacks. endemic
 Phymaspermum peglerae (Hutch.) Kallersjo, endemic
 Phymaspermum pinnatifidum (Oliv.) Kallersjo, endemic
 Phymaspermum pubescens (DC.) Kuntze, accepted as Phymaspermum parvifolium (DC.) Benth. & Hook. ex B.D.Jacks. endemic
 Phymaspermum schroeteri Compton, accepted as Phymaspermum thymelaeoides (DC.) Magee & Ruiters, endemic
 Phymaspermum scoparium (DC.) Kallersjo, endemic
 Phymaspermum thymelaeoides (DC.) Magee & Ruiters, endemic
 Phymaspermum trifidum Magee & Ruiters, endemic
 Phymaspermum villosum (Hilliard) Kallersjo, accepted as Phymaspermum acerosum (DC.) Kallersjo, endemic
 Phymaspermum woodii (Thell.) Kallersjo, indigenous

Picris 
Genus Picris:
 Picris echioides L. accepted as Helminthotheca echioides (L.) Holub, not indigenous
 Picris hieracioides L. not indigenous

Planea 
Genus Planea:
 Planea schlechteri (L.Bolus) P.O.Karis, endemic

Platycarpha 
Genus Platycarpha:
 Platycarpha carlinoides Oliv. & Hiern, accepted as Platycarphella carlinoides (Oliv. & Hiern) V.A.Funk & H.Rob. indigenous
 Platycarpha glomerata (Thunb.) Less. endemic
 Platycarpha parvifolia S.Moore, accepted as Platycarphella parvifolia (S.Moore) V.A.Funk & H.Rob. endemic

Platycarphella 
Genus Platycarphella:
 Platycarphella carlinoides (Oliv. & Hiern) V.A.Funk & H.Rob. indigenous
 Platycarphella parvifolia (S.Moore) V.A.Funk & H.Rob. endemic

Plecostachys 
Genus Plecostachys:
 Plecostachys polifolia (Thunb.) Hilliard & B.L.Burtt, indigenous
 Plecostachys serpyllifolia (P.J.Bergius) Hilliard & B.L.Burtt, endemic

Plectreca 
Genus Plectreca:
 Plectreca corymbosa (Thunb.) Raf. accepted as Gymnanthemum corymbosum (L.f.) H.Rob. indigenous

Pluchea 
Genus Pluchea:
 Pluchea bojeri (DC.) Humbert, indigenous
 Pluchea integrifolia Mattf. accepted as Pluchea bojeri (DC.) Humbert
 Pluchea scabrida DC. accepted as Conyza scabrida DC. indigenous

Poecilolepis 
Genus Poecilolepis:
 Poecilolepis ficoidea (DC.) Grau, endemic
 Poecilolepis maritima (Bolus) Grau, endemic

Polyarrhena 
Genus Polyarrhena:
 Polyarrhena imbricata (DC.) Grau, endemic
 Polyarrhena prostrata Grau, indigenous
 Polyarrhena prostrata Grau subsp.dentata Grau, endemic
 Polyarrhena prostrata Grau subsp.prostrata, endemic
 Polyarrhena reflexa (L.) Cass. indigenous
 Polyarrhena reflexa (L.) Cass. subsp.brachyphylla (Sond. ex Harv.) Grau, endemic
 Polyarrhena reflexa (L.) Cass. subsp.reflexa, endemic
 Polyarrhena stricta Grau, endemic

Polydora 
Genus Polydora:
 Polydora angustifolia (Steetz) H.Rob. indigenous
 Polydora poskeana (Vatke & Hildebr.) H.Rob. indigenous
 Polydora steetziana (Oliv. & Hiern) H.Rob. indigenous

Printzia 
Genus Printzia:
 Printzia aromatica (L.) Less. endemic
 Printzia auriculata Harv. indigenous
 Printzia huttoni Harv. endemic
 Printzia nutans (Bolus) Leins, indigenous
 Printzia polifolia (L.) Hutch. endemic
 Printzia pyrifolia Less. indigenous

Pseudoconyza 
Genus Pseudoconyza:
 Pseudoconyza viscosa (Mill.) D'Arcy, indigenous

Pseudognaphalium 
Genus Pseudognaphalium:
 Pseudognaphalium luteoalbum (L.) Hilliard & B.L.Burtt, not indigenous
 Pseudognaphalium oligandrum (DC.) Hilliard & B.L.Burtt, indigenous
 Pseudognaphalium undulatum (L.) Hilliard & B.L.Burtt, indigenous

Pseudopegolettia 
Genus Pseudopegolettia:
 Pseudopegolettia tenella (DC.) H.Rob. Skvarla & V.A.Funk, indigenous
 Pseudopegolettia thodei (E.Phillips) H.Rob. Skvarla & V.A.Funk, endemic

Psiadia 
Genus Psiadia:
 Psiadia punctulata (DC.) Vatke, indigenous

Pteronia 
Genus Pteronia:
 Pteronia acuminata DC. indigenous
 Pteronia acuta Muschl. indigenous
 Pteronia adenocarpa Harv. endemic
 Pteronia ambrariifolia Schltr. endemic
 Pteronia anisata B.Nord. endemic
 Pteronia arcuata Dinter, accepted as Pteronia glauca Thunb.
 Pteronia aspalatha DC. endemic
 Pteronia beckeoides DC. endemic
 Pteronia bolusii E.Phillips, endemic
 Pteronia callosa DC. endemic
 Pteronia camphorata (L.) L. indigenous
 Pteronia camphorata (L.) L. var.armata Harv. endemic
 Pteronia camphorata (L.) L. var.camphorata, endemic
 Pteronia camphorata (L.) L. var.laevigata Harv. endemic
 Pteronia camphorata (L.) L. var.longifolia Harv. endemic
 Pteronia candollei Harv. accepted as Pteronia glauca Thunb. indigenous
 Pteronia centauroides DC. endemic
 Pteronia ciliata Thunb. indigenous
 Pteronia cinerea L.f. endemic
 Pteronia cylindracea DC. indigenous
 Pteronia diosmifolia Brusse, endemic
 Pteronia divaricata (P.J.Bergius) Less. indigenous
 Pteronia elata B.Nord. endemic
 Pteronia elongata Thunb. endemic
 Pteronia empetrifolia DC. endemic
 Pteronia erythrochaeta DC. endemic
 Pteronia fasciculata L.f. endemic
 Pteronia fastigiata Thunb. endemic
 Pteronia flexicaulis L.f. endemic
 Pteronia foleyi Hutch. & E.Phillips, endemic
 Pteronia glabrata DC. accepted as Pteronia glauca Thunb. indigenous
 Pteronia glabrata L.f. indigenous
 Pteronia glauca Thunb. indigenous
 Pteronia glauca Thunb. subsp.arcuata (Dinter) Merxm. accepted as Pteronia glauca Thunb.
 Pteronia glaucescens DC. endemic
 Pteronia glomerata L.f. endemic
 Pteronia gymnocline DC. endemic
 Pteronia heterocarpa DC. endemic
 Pteronia hirsuta L.f. endemic
 Pteronia hutchinsoniana Compton, endemic
 Pteronia incana (Burm.) DC. endemic
 Pteronia inflexa Thunb. ex L.f. indigenous
 Pteronia intermedia Hutch. & E.Phillips, endemic
 Pteronia kingesii Merxm. accepted as Pteronia polygalifolia O.Hoffm. present
 Pteronia latisquama DC. accepted as Pteronia glauca Thunb. indigenous
 Pteronia leptospermoides DC. endemic
 Pteronia leucoclada Turcz. indigenous
 Pteronia leucoloma DC. endemic
 Pteronia lucilioides DC. indigenous
 Pteronia membranacea L.f. endemic
 Pteronia mooreiana Hutch. endemic
 Pteronia mucronata DC. indigenous
 Pteronia oblanceolata E.Phillips, endemic
 Pteronia onobromoides DC. indigenous
 Pteronia oppositifolia L. endemic
 Pteronia ovalifolia DC. endemic
 Pteronia pallens L.f. endemic
 Pteronia paniculata Thunb. indigenous
 Pteronia pillansii Hutch. endemic
 Pteronia punctata E.Phillips, endemic
 Pteronia quinqueflora DC. endemic
 Pteronia scabra Harv. endemic
 Pteronia scariosa L.f. indigenous
 Pteronia sordida N.E.Br. indigenous
 Pteronia staehelinoides DC. endemic
 Pteronia stricta Aiton, indigenous
 Pteronia stricta Aiton var.longifolia E.Phillips, endemic
 Pteronia stricta Aiton var.stricta, endemic
 Pteronia succulenta Thunb. endemic
 Pteronia tenuifolia DC. endemic
 Pteronia teretifolia (Thunb.) Fourc. endemic
 Pteronia thymifolia Muschl. & Dinter, accepted as Pteronia glauca Thunb.
 Pteronia tricephala DC. endemic
 Pteronia uncinata DC. endemic
 Pteronia undulata DC. endemic
 Pteronia unguiculata S.Moore, indigenous
 Pteronia utilis Hutch. endemic
 Pteronia villosa L.f. endemic
 Pteronia viscosa Thunb. indigenous

Pterothrix 
Genus Pterothrix:
 Pterothrix flaccida Schltr. ex Hutch. & E.Phillips, accepted as Amphiglossa tomentosa (Thunb.) Harv. present
 Pterothrix perotrichoides (DC.) Harv. accepted as Amphiglossa perotrichoides DC. present
 Pterothrix spinescens DC. accepted as Amphiglossa triflora DC. present
 Pterothrix tecta Brusse, accepted as Amphiglossa tecta (Brusse) Koekemoer, present
 Pterothrix thuja Merxm. accepted as Amphiglossa thuja (Merxm.) Koekemoer

Pulicaria 
Genus Pulicaria:
 Pulicaria scabra (Thunb.) Druce, indigenous

Relhania 
Genus Relhania:
 Relhania acerosa (DC.) K.Bremer, indigenous
 Relhania calycina (L.f.) L'Her. indigenous
 Relhania calycina (L.f.) L'Her. subsp. apiculata (DC.) K.Bremer, endemic
 Relhania calycina (L.f.) L'Her. subsp. calycina, endemic
 Relhania calycina (L.f.) L'Her. subsp. lanceolata K.Bremer, endemic
 Relhania corymbosa (Bolus) K.Bremer, endemic
 Relhania decussata L'Her. endemic
 Relhania fruticosa (L.) K.Bremer, endemic
 Relhania garnotii (Less.) K.Bremer, endemic
 Relhania pungens L'Her. indigenous
 Relhania pungens L'Her. subsp. angustifolia (DC.) K.Bremer, endemic
 Relhania pungens L'Her. subsp. pungens, endemic
 Relhania pungens L'Her. subsp. trinervis (Thunb.) K.Bremer, endemic
 Relhania relhanioides (Schltr.) K.Bremer, endemic
 Relhania rotundifolia Less. endemic
 Relhania spathulifolia K.Bremer, endemic
 Relhania speciosa (DC.) Harv. endemic
 Relhania tricephala (DC.) K.Bremer, endemic

Rennera 
Genus Rennera:
 Rennera stellata P.P.J.Herman, accepted as Pentzia stellata (P.P.J.Herman) Magee, endemic

Rhynchopsidium 
Genus Rhynchopsidium:
 Rhynchopsidium pumilum (L.f.) DC. endemic
 Rhynchopsidium sessiliflorum (L.f.) DC. endemic

Roldana 
Genus Roldana:
 Roldana petasitis (Sims) H.Rob. & Brettell, not indigenous, cultivated

Roodebergia 
Genus Roodebergia:
 Roodebergia kitamurana B.Nord. endemic

Rosenia 
Genus Rosenia:
 Rosenia glandulosa Thunb. endemic
 Rosenia humilis (Less.) K.Bremer, indigenous
 Rosenia oppositifolia (DC.) K.Bremer, endemic
 Rosenia spinescens DC. endemic

Schistostephium 
Genus Schistostephium:
 Schistostephium artemisiifolium Baker, accepted as Schistostephium crataegifolium (DC.) Fenzl ex Harv.
 Schistostephium crataegifolium (DC.) Fenzl ex Harv. indigenous
 Schistostephium flabelliforme Less. endemic
 Schistostephium griseum (Harv.) Hutch. indigenous
 Schistostephium heptalobum (DC.) Hutch. accepted as Schistostephium crataegifolium (DC.) Fenzl ex Harv.
 Schistostephium heptalobum (DC.) Oliv. & Hiern, accepted as Schistostephium crataegifolium (DC.) Fenzl ex Harv. present
 Schistostephium hippiifolium (DC.) Hutch. endemic
 Schistostephium rotundifolium (DC.) Fenzl ex Harv. indigenous
 Schistostephium scandens Hutch. accepted as Schistostephium crataegifolium (DC.) Fenzl ex Harv. endemic
 Schistostephium umbellatum (L.f.) K.Bremer & Humphries, endemic

Schkuhria 
Genus Schkuhria:
 Schkuhria pinnata (Lam.) Kuntze ex Thell. not indigenous

Senecio 
Genus Senecio:
 Senecio abbreviatus S.Moore, endemic
 Senecio abruptus Thunb. endemic
 Senecio acaulis (L.) Sch.Bip. accepted as Curio acaulis (L.) P.V.Heath var. acaulis, present
 Senecio achilleifolius DC. indigenous
 Senecio acutifolius DC. endemic
 Senecio addoensis Compton, accepted as Caputia scaposa (DC.) B.Nord. & Pelser var. addoensis (Compton) B.Nord. & Pelser, present
 Senecio adnatus DC. indigenous
 Senecio affinis DC. indigenous
 Senecio agapetes C.Jeffrey, endemic
 Senecio aizoides (DC.) Sch.Bip. accepted as Curio talinoides (DC.) P.V.Heath var. aizoides (DC.) P.V.Heath, present
 Senecio albanensis DC. indigenous
 Senecio albanensis DC. var. albanensis, indigenous
 Senecio albanensis DC. var. doroniciflorus (DC.) Harv. indigenous
 Senecio albanopsis Hilliard, endemic
 Senecio albifolius DC. endemic
 Senecio albopunctatus Bolus, endemic
 Senecio alliariifolius O.Hoffm. accepted as Dauresia alliariifolia (O.Hoffm.) B.Nord. & Pelser
 Senecio aloides DC. indigenous
 Senecio amabilis DC. accepted as Senecio agapetes C.Jeffrey, present
 Senecio anapetes C.Jeffrey, indigenous
 Senecio angulatus L.f. endemic
 Senecio angustifolius (Thunb.) Willd. indigenous
 Senecio anomalochrous Hilliard, endemic
 Senecio anthemifolius Harv. endemic
 Senecio apiifolius (DC.) Benth. & Hook.f. ex O.Hoffm. accepted as Mesogramma apiifolium DC. indigenous
 Senecio aquifoliaceus DC. endemic
 Senecio arabidifolius O.Hoffm. indigenous
 Senecio arenarius Thunb. indigenous
 Senecio arniciflorus DC. endemic
 Senecio articulatus (L.) Sch.Bip. endemic
 Senecio asperulus DC. indigenous
 Senecio austromontanus Hilliard, indigenous
 Senecio barbatus DC. indigenous
 Senecio barbertonicus Klatt, indigenous
 Senecio basalticus Hilliard, indigenous
 Senecio baurii Oliv. endemic
 Senecio bellis Harv. endemic
 Senecio bipinnatus (Thunb.) Less. endemic
 Senecio brachypodus DC. indigenous
 Senecio brevidentatus M.D.Hend. endemic
 Senecio brevilorus Hilliard, endemic
 Senecio breviscapus (DC.) Sch.Bip. accepted as Curio cicatricosus (Sch.Bip.) P.V.Heath, present
 Senecio bryoniifolius Harv. indigenous
 Senecio bulbinifolius DC. indigenous
 Senecio bupleuroides DC. indigenous
 Senecio burchellii DC. endemic
 Senecio byrnensis Hilliard, endemic
 Senecio cadiscus B.Nord. & Pelser, endemic
 Senecio cakilefolius DC. accepted as Senecio arenarius Thunb. indigenous
 Senecio caloneotes Hilliard, indigenous
 Senecio canalipes DC. endemic
 Senecio cardaminifolius DC. endemic
 Senecio carnosus Thunb. endemic
 Senecio carroensis DC. endemic
 Senecio cathcartensis O.Hoffm. indigenous
 Senecio caudatus DC. indigenous
 Senecio chrysocoma Meerb. endemic
 Senecio cicatricosus Sch.Bip. accepted as Curio cicatricosus (Sch.Bip.) P.V.Heath, present
 Senecio cinerascens Aiton, indigenous
 Senecio citriceps Hilliard & B.L.Burtt, endemic
 Senecio citriformis G.D.Rowley, accepted as Curio citriformis (G.D.Rowley) P.V.Heath, present
 Senecio coleophyllus Turcz. endemic
 Senecio comptonii J.C.Manning & Goldblatt, indigenous
 Senecio conrathii N.E.Br. indigenous
 Senecio consanguineus DC. indigenous
 Senecio cordifolius L.f. endemic
 Senecio cornu-cervi MacOwan, endemic
 Senecio coronatus (Thunb.) Harv. indigenous
 Senecio corymbiferus DC. accepted as Senecio sarcoides C.Jeffrey, present
 Senecio cotyledonis DC. indigenous
 Senecio crassiusculus DC. endemic
 Senecio crassulifolius (DC.) Sch.Bip. accepted as Curio crassulifolius (DC.) P.V.Heath, present
 Senecio crenatus Thunb. endemic
 Senecio crenulatus DC. endemic
 Senecio crispus Thunb. endemic
 Senecio cristimontanus Hilliard, endemic
 Senecio cryptolanatus Killick, indigenous
 Senecio cymbalariifolius (Thunb.) Less. accepted as Senecio hastifolius (L.f.) Less. present
 Senecio debilis Harv. accepted as Senecio infirmus C.Jeffrey, present
 Senecio decurrens DC. indigenous
 Senecio deltoideus Less. indigenous
 Senecio diffusus Thunb. endemic
 Senecio digitalifolius DC. indigenous
 Senecio diodon DC. endemic
 Senecio discodregeanus Hilliard & B.L.Burtt, indigenous
 Senecio dissidens Fourc. endemic
 Senecio dissimulans Hilliard, indigenous
 Senecio diversifolius (DC.) Harv. accepted as Bolandia pinnatifida (Thunb.) J.C.Manning & Cron, present
 Senecio diversifolius (DC.) Harv. var. integrifolius Harv. accepted as Bolandia elongata (L.f.) J.C.Manning & Cron, indigenous
 Senecio dracunculoides DC. accepted as Senecio burchellii DC. present
 Senecio dregeanus DC. endemic
 Senecio dumosus Fourc. endemic
 Senecio eenii (S.Moore) Merxm. indigenous
 Senecio elegans L. endemic
 Senecio eminens Compton, indigenous
 Senecio eriobasis DC. accepted as Senecio erosus L.f. endemic
 Senecio erosus L.f. endemic
 Senecio erubescens Aiton, indigenous
 Senecio erubescens Aiton var. crepidifolius DC. indigenous
 Senecio erubescens Aiton var. dichotomus DC. indigenous
 Senecio erubescens Aiton var. erubescens, endemic
 Senecio erubescens Aiton var. incisus DC. endemic
 Senecio erysimoides DC. endemic
 Senecio esterhuyseniae J.C.Manning & Goldblatt, indigenous
 Senecio euryopoides DC. endemic
 Senecio evelynae Muschl. endemic
 Senecio expansus Harv. accepted as Senecio anapetes C.Jeffrey, present
 Senecio exuberans R.A.Dyer, endemic
 Senecio ficoides (L.) Sch.Bip. accepted as Curio ficoides (L.) P.V.Heath, endemic
 Senecio filifolius Harv. accepted as Senecio mitophyllus C.Jeffrey, present
 Senecio flanaganii E.Phillips, endemic
 Senecio flavus (Decne.) Sch.Bip. indigenous
 Senecio foeniculoides Harv. endemic
 Senecio gariepiensis Cron, indigenous
 Senecio gerrardii Harv. indigenous
 Senecio giessii Merxm. indigenous
 Senecio glaberrimus DC. indigenous
 Senecio glabrifolius DC. accepted as Bolandia glabrifolia (DC.) J.C.Manning & Cron, present
 Senecio glanduloso-lanosus Thell. endemic
 Senecio glanduloso-pilosus Volkens & Muschl. endemic
 Senecio glastifolius L.f. endemic
 Senecio glutinarius DC. endemic
 Senecio glutinosus Thunb. indigenous
 Senecio gramineus Harv. indigenous
 Senecio grandiflorus P.J.Bergius, endemic
 Senecio gregatus Hilliard, indigenous
 Senecio halimifolius L. endemic
 Senecio hallianus G.D.Rowley, accepted as Curio hallianus (G.D.Rowley) P.V.Heath, endemic
 Senecio harveianus MacOwan, indigenous
 Senecio hastatus L. indigenous
 Senecio hastifolius (L.f.) Less. endemic
 Senecio haworthii (Sweet) Sch.Bip. accepted as Caputia tomentosa (Hutch.) B.Nord. & Pelser, endemic
 Senecio haygarthii Hilliard, indigenous
 Senecio hederiformis Cron, endemic
 Senecio heliopsis Hilliard & B.L.Burtt, indigenous
 Senecio helminthioides (Sch.Bip.) Hilliard, indigenous
 Senecio herreanus Dinter, accepted as Curio herreanus (Dinter) P.V.Heath
 Senecio hieracioides DC. indigenous
 Senecio hirsutilobus Hilliard, endemic
 Senecio hirtellus DC. endemic
 Senecio hirtifolius DC. endemic
 Senecio hochstetteri Sch.Bip. ex A.Rich. endemic
 Senecio hollandii Compton, endemic
 Senecio holubii Hutch. & Burtt Davy, endemic
 Senecio humidanus C.Jeffrey, indigenous
 Senecio hygrophilus R.A.Dyer & C.A.Sm. accepted as Senecio humidanus C.Jeffrey, present
 Senecio hypochoerideus DC. indigenous
 Senecio ilicifolius L. endemic
 Senecio inaequidens DC. indigenous
 Senecio incertus DC. endemic
 Senecio incisus Thunb. endemic
 Senecio incomptus DC. endemic
 Senecio infirmus C.Jeffrey, endemic
 Senecio ingeliensis Hilliard, indigenous
 Senecio inornatus DC. indigenous
 Senecio intricatus S.Moore, endemic
 Senecio isatideus DC. indigenous
 Senecio isatidioides E.Phillips & C.A.Sm. indigenous
 Senecio junceus (DC.) Harv. indigenous
 Senecio juniperinus L.f. indigenous
 Senecio juniperinus L.f. var. epitrachys (DC.) Harv. endemic
 Senecio juniperinus L.f. var. juniperinus, endemic
 Senecio junodii Hutch. & Burtt Davy, endemic
 Senecio kalingenwae Hilliard & B.L.Burtt, endemic
 Senecio laevigatus Thunb. indigenous
 Senecio laevigatus Thunb. var. integrifolius Harv. endemic
 Senecio laevigatus Thunb. var. laevigatus, endemic
 Senecio lanceus Aiton, endemic
 Senecio laticipes Bruyns, endemic
 Senecio latifolius DC. indigenous
 Senecio latissimifolius S.Moore, endemic
 Senecio laxus DC. endemic
 Senecio leptophyllus DC. endemic
 Senecio lessingii Harv. endemic
 Senecio leucoglossus Sond. endemic
 Senecio lineatus (L.f.) DC. endemic
 Senecio linifolius L. indigenous
 Senecio litorosus Fourc. endemic
 Senecio littoreus Thunb. indigenous
 Senecio littoreus Thunb. var. hispidulus Harv. endemic
 Senecio littoreus Thunb. var. littoreus, endemic
 Senecio lobelioid DC. accepted as Senecio flavus (Decne.) Sch.Bip. endemic
 Senecio lycopodioides Schltr. endemic
 Senecio lydenburgensis Hutch. & Burtt Davy, indigenous
 Senecio lygodes Hiern, accepted as Senecio inornatus DC. present
 Senecio lyratus L.f. accepted as Senecio variifolius DC. indigenous
 Senecio macowanii Hilliard, endemic
 Senecio macrocephalus DC. indigenous
 Senecio macroglossoides Hilliard, endemic
 Senecio macroglossus DC. indigenous
 Senecio macrospermus DC. indigenous
 Senecio madagascariensis Poir. indigenous
 Senecio marginalis Hilliard, endemic
 Senecio maritimus L. endemic
 Senecio matricariifolius DC. endemic
 Senecio mauricei Hilliard & B.L.Burtt, endemic
 Senecio maydae Merxm. accepted as Senecio albopunctatus Bolus, present
 Senecio mbuluzensis Compton, indigenous
 Senecio medley-woodii Hutch. accepted as Caputia medley-woodii (Hutch.) B.Nord. & Pelser, indigenous
 Senecio microglossus DC. indigenous
 Senecio microspermus DC. endemic
 Senecio mimetes Hutch. & R.A.Dyer, endemic
 Senecio mitophyllus C.Jeffrey, endemic
 Senecio monticola DC. indigenous
 Senecio mooreanus Hutch. & Burtt Davy, endemic
 Senecio mucronatus (Thunb.) Willd. endemic
 Senecio muirii L.Bolus, endemic
 Senecio multibracteatus Harv. endemic
 Senecio multicaulis DC. endemic
 Senecio muricatus Thunb. endemic
 Senecio napifolius MacOwan, endemic
 Senecio natalicola Hilliard, endemic
 Senecio neoviscidulus Soldano, indigenous
 Senecio ngoyanus Hilliard, indigenous
 Senecio niveus (Thunb.) Willd. indigenous
 Senecio odontopterus DC. endemic
 Senecio oederiifolius DC. endemic
 Senecio oliganthus DC. accepted as Senecio pauciflosculosus C.Jeffrey, present
 Senecio othonniflorus DC. indigenous
 Senecio ovoideus (Compton) H.Jacobsen, endemic
 Senecio oxyodontus DC. endemic
 Senecio oxyriifolius DC. indigenous
 Senecio oxyriifolius DC. subsp. oxyriifolius, indigenous
 Senecio paarlensis DC. endemic
 Senecio paludaffinis Hilliard, indigenous
 Senecio panduratus (Thunb.) Less. accepted as Senecio erosus L.f. endemic
 Senecio panduriformis Hilliard, indigenous
 Senecio paniculatus P.J.Bergius, indigenous
 Senecio parascitus Hilliard, indigenous
 Senecio parentalis Hilliard & B.L.Burtt, endemic
 Senecio parvifolius DC. accepted as Senecio carroensis DC. endemic
 Senecio paucicalyculatus Klatt, accepted as Senecio parentalis Hilliard & B.L.Burtt, indigenous
 Senecio pauciflosculosus C.Jeffrey, endemic
 Senecio pearsonii Hutch. accepted as Senecio asperulus DC. endemic
 Senecio pellucidus DC. endemic
 Senecio penninervius DC. endemic
 Senecio pentactinus Klatt, indigenous
 Senecio persicifolius L. endemic
 Senecio petiolaris DC. accepted as Bolandia pinnatifida (Thunb.) J.C.Manning & Cron, endemic
 Senecio pillansii Levyns, endemic
 Senecio pinguifolius (DC.) Sch.Bip. indigenous
 Senecio pinifolius (L.) Lam. endemic
 Senecio pinnatifidus (P.J.Bergius) Less. endemic
 Senecio pinnulatus Thunb. endemic
 Senecio piptocoma O.Hoffm. indigenous
 Senecio pleistocephalus S.Moore, indigenous
 Senecio polelensis Hilliard, endemic
 Senecio polyanthemoides Sch.Bip. indigenous
 Senecio polyodon DC. indigenous
 Senecio polyodon DC. var. polyodon, indigenous
 Senecio polyodon DC. var. subglaber (Kuntze) Hilliard & B.L.Burtt, indigenous
 Senecio pondoensis Van Jaarsv. & A.E.van Wyk, accepted as Curio pondoensis (Van Jaarsv. & A.E.van Wyk) J.C.Manning, indigenous
 Senecio poseideonis Hilliard & B.L.Burtt, endemic
 Senecio praeteritus Killick, endemic
 Senecio prostratus Klatt, endemic
 Senecio pseudolongifolius Sch.Bip. ex J.Calvo, indigenous
 Senecio pterophorus DC. indigenous
 Senecio puberulus DC. endemic
 Senecio pubigerus L. endemic
 Senecio purpureus L. endemic
 Senecio pyramidatus DC. accepted as Caputia pyramidata (DC.) B.Nord. & Pelser, endemic
 Senecio qathlambanus Hilliard, indigenous
 Senecio quinquelobus (Thunb.) DC. endemic
 Senecio quinquenervius Sond. endemic
 Senecio radicans (L.) Sch.Bip. accepted as Curio radicans (L.) P.V.Heath, indigenous
 Senecio rehmannii Bolus, endemic
 Senecio repandus Thunb. endemic
 Senecio reptans Turcz. endemic
 Senecio retortus (DC.) Benth. endemic
 Senecio retrorsus DC. indigenous
 Senecio rhomboideus Harv. indigenous
 Senecio rhyncholaenus DC. indigenous
 Senecio rigidus L. endemic
 Senecio robertiifolius DC. endemic
 Senecio rosmarinifolius L.f. endemic
 Senecio rowleyanus H.Jacobsen, accepted as Curio roeleanus (H.Jacobsen) P.V.Heath, present
 Senecio ruwenzoriensis S.Moore, indigenous
 Senecio sandersonii Harv. endemic
 Senecio saniensis Hilliard & B.L.Burtt, indigenous
 Senecio sarcoides C.Jeffrey, indigenous
 Senecio scapiflorus (L'Her.) C.A.Sm. accepted as Bolandia elongata (L.f.) J.C.Manning & Cron, endemic
 Senecio scaposus DC. accepted as Caputia scaposa (DC.) B.Nord. & Pelser, indigenous
 Senecio scaposus DC. var. addoensis (Compton) G.D.Rowley, accepted as Caputia scaposa (DC.) B.Nord. & Pelser var. addoensis (Compton) B.Nord. & Pelser, indigenous
 Senecio scaposus DC. var. scaposus, endemic
 Senecio scitus Hutch. & Burtt Davy, indigenous
 Senecio scoparius Harv. indigenous
 Senecio seminiveus J.M.Wood & M.S.Evans, indigenous
 Senecio serpens G.D.Rowley, accepted as Curio repens (L.) P.V.Heath, endemic
 Senecio serratuloides DC. indigenous
 Senecio serrulatus DC. indigenous
 Senecio serrurioides Turcz. endemic
 Senecio sisymbriifolius DC. indigenous
 Senecio skirrhodon DC. indigenous
 Senecio sociorum Bolus, endemic
 Senecio sophioides DC. endemic
 Senecio speciosissimus J.C.Manning & Goldblatt, endemic
 Senecio speciosus Willd. indigenous
 Senecio spiraeifolius Thunb. endemic
 Senecio striatifolius DC. indigenous
 Senecio subcanescens (DC.) Compton, accepted as Senecio rigidus L. endemic
 Senecio subcoriaceus Schltr. indigenous
 Senecio submontanus Hilliard & B.L.Burtt, endemic
 Senecio subrubriflorus O.Hoffm. indigenous
 Senecio subsinuatus DC. endemic
 Senecio succulentus DC. accepted as Senecio sarcoides C.Jeffrey
 Senecio sulcicalyx Baker, accepted as Curio sulcicalyx (Baker) P.V.Heath
 Senecio surculosus MacOwan, endemic
 Senecio talinoides (DC.) Sch.Bip. subsp. aizoides (DC.) G.D.Rowley, accepted as Curio talinoides (DC.) P.V.Heath var. aizoides (DC.) P.V.Heath, endemic
 Senecio tamoides DC. indigenous
 Senecio tanacetopsis Hilliard, indigenous
 Senecio telmateius Hilliard, indigenous
 Senecio tenellus DC. endemic
 Senecio thamathuensis Hilliard, endemic
 Senecio thunbergii Harv. endemic
 Senecio tortuosus DC. endemic
 Senecio toxotis C.Jeffrey, accepted as Curio arcuarii (Compton) P.V.Heath, endemic
 Senecio trachylaenus Harv. endemic
 Senecio trachyphyllus Schltr. endemic
 Senecio trifurcatus Klatt, accepted as Senecio triodontiphyllus C.Jeffrey, present
 Senecio triodontiphyllus C.Jeffrey, endemic
 Senecio triplinervius DC. endemic
 Senecio triqueter DC. endemic
 Senecio tropaeolifolius MacOwan, indigenous
 Senecio tuberosus (DC.) Harv. accepted as Senecio incertus DC. indigenous
 Senecio tugelensis J.M.Wood & M.S.Evans, indigenous
 Senecio tysonii MacOwan, endemic
 Senecio ulopterus Thell. endemic
 Senecio umbellatus L. endemic
 Senecio umbricola Cron & B.Nord. indigenous
 Senecio umgeniensis Thell. endemic
 Senecio urophyllus Conrath, endemic
 Senecio variabilis Sch.Bip. endemic
 Senecio variifolius DC. endemic
 Senecio venosus Harv. indigenous
 Senecio verbascifolius Burm.f. endemic
 Senecio vernonioides Sch.Bip. accepted as Senecio erubescens Aiton var. erubescens, indigenous
 Senecio vestitus (Thunb.) P.J.Bergius, endemic
 Senecio villifructus Hilliard, endemic
 Senecio viminalis Bremek. indigenous
 Senecio viscidulus Compton, accepted as Senecio neoviscidulus Soldano, indigenous
 Senecio vitalis N.E.Br. accepted as Senecio talinoides (DC.) Sch.Bip. subsp. cylindricus (A.Berger) G.D.Rowley, endemic
 Senecio vulgaris L. not indigenous, invasive
 Senecio waterbergensis S.Moore, endemic
 Senecio windhoekensis Merxm. indigenous
 Senecio wittebergensis Compton, endemic

Seneciodes 
Genus Seneciodes:
 Seneciodes cinereum (L.) Kuntze, accepted as Cyanthillium cinereum (L.) H.Rob. not indigenous

Seriphium 
Genus Seriphium:
 Seriphium cinereum L. indigenous
 Seriphium gnaphaloides L. accepted as Elytropappus gnaphaloides (L.) Levyns, indigenous
 Seriphium incanum (Thunb.) Pers. endemic
 Seriphium plumosum L. indigenous
 Seriphium saxatilis (Levyns) Koekemoer, endemic
 Seriphium spirale (Less.) Koekemoer, endemic

Sigesbeckia 
Genus Sigesbeckia:
 Sigesbeckia orientalis L. not indigenous

Silybum 
Genus Silybum:
 Silybum marianum (L.) Gaertn. not indigenous

Solanecio 
Genus Solanecio:
 Solanecio angulatus (Vahl) C.Jeffrey, indigenous

Solidago 
Genus Solidago:
 Solidago canadensis L. not indigenous, cultivated

Soliva 
Genus Soliva:
 Soliva pterosperma (Juss.) Less. accepted as Soliva sessilis Ruiz & Pav. not indigenous
 Soliva sessilis Ruiz & Pav. not indigenous

Sonchus 
Genus Sonchus:
 Sonchus asper (L.) Hill subsp. asper, not indigenous, invasive
 Sonchus asper (L.) Hill subsp. glaucescens (Jord.) Ball, not indigenous
 Sonchus dregeanus DC. indigenous
 Sonchus friesii Boulos, indigenous
 Sonchus friesii Boulos var. friesii, indigenous
 Sonchus integrifolius Harv. indigenous
 Sonchus integrifolius Harv. var. integrifolius, indigenous
 Sonchus integrifolius Harv. var. schlechteri R.E.Fr. indigenous
 Sonchus jacottetianus Thell. indigenous
 Sonchus maritimus L. not indigenous
 Sonchus nanus Sond. ex Harv. indigenous
 Sonchus oleraceus L. not indigenous, invasive
 Sonchus tenerrimus L. indigenous
 Sonchus wilmsii R.E.Fr. indigenous

Sphaeranthus 
Genus Sphaeranthus:
 Sphaeranthus humilis O.Hoffm. accepted as Sphaeranthus flexuosus O.Hoffm.
 Sphaeranthus incisus Robyns, accepted as Sphaeranthus peduncularis DC. subsp. peduncularis, present
 Sphaeranthus peduncularis DC. indigenous
 Sphaeranthus peduncularis DC. subsp. peduncularis, indigenous

Sphagneticola 
Genus Sphagneticola:
 Sphagneticola trilobata (L.) Pruski, not indigenous, invasive

Spilanthes 
Genus Spilanthes:
 Spilanthes decumbens (Sm.) A.H.Moore, accepted as Acmella decumbens (Sm.) R.K.Jansen, not indigenous
 Spilanthes mauritiana (Pers.) DC. accepted as Acmella caulirhiza Delile, present

Staehelina 
Genus Staehelina:
 Staehelina corymbosa L.f. accepted as Gymnanthemum corymbosum (L.f.) H.Rob. indigenous

Steirodiscus 
Genus Steirodiscus:
 Steirodiscus capillaceus (Thunb.) Less. endemic
 Steirodiscus gamolepis Bolus ex Schltr. endemic
 Steirodiscus linearilobus DC. endemic
 Steirodiscus schlechteri Bolus ex Schltr. endemic
 Steirodiscus speciosus (Pillans) B.Nord. endemic
 Steirodiscus tagetes (L.) Schltr. endemic

Stengelia 
Genus Stengelia:
 Stengelia adoensis Sch.Bip. ex Hochst. accepted as Baccharoides adoensis (Sch.Bip. ex Walp.) H.Rob. indigenous

Stilpnogyne 
Genus Stilpnogyne:
 Stilpnogyne bellidioides DC. endemic

Stoebe 
Genus Stoebe:
 Stoebe aethiopica L. endemic
 Stoebe alopecuroides (Lam.) Less. endemic
 Stoebe bruniades (Rchb.) Levyns, accepted as Stoebe capitata P.J.Bergius, present
 Stoebe burchellii Levyns, accepted as Seriphium plumosum L. present
 Stoebe capitata P.J.Bergius, endemic
 Stoebe cinerea (L.) Thunb. accepted as Seriphium cinereum L. present
 Stoebe copholepis Sch.Bip. accepted as Stoebe phyllostachya (DC.) Sch.Bip. present
 Stoebe cyathuloides Schltr. endemic
 Stoebe ensorii Compton, accepted as Stoebe phyllostachya (DC.) Sch.Bip. present
 Stoebe fusca (L.) Thunb. endemic
 Stoebe gomphrenoides (Lam.) P.J.Bergius, endemic
 Stoebe humilis Levyns, accepted as Stoebe cyathuloides Schltr. present
 Stoebe incana Thunb. accepted as Seriphium incanum (Thunb.) Pers. present
 Stoebe intricata Levyns, endemic
 Stoebe leucocephala DC. endemic
 Stoebe microphylla DC. endemic
 Stoebe montana Schltr. ex Levyns, endemic
 Stoebe muirii Levyns, endemic
 Stoebe muricata Spreng. ex Sch.Bip. endemic
 Stoebe nervigera (DC.) Sch.Bip. endemic
 Stoebe nivea Thunb. accepted as Dolichothrix ericoides (Lam.) Hilliard & B.L.Burtt, indigenous
 Stoebe phyllostachya (DC.) Sch.Bip. endemic
 Stoebe plumosa (L.) Thunb. accepted as Seriphium plumosum L. present
 Stoebe prostrata L. endemic
 Stoebe rosea Wolley-Dod, endemic
 Stoebe rugulosa Harv. endemic
 Stoebe salteri Levyns, accepted as Stoebe schultzii Levyns, present
 Stoebe saxatilis Levyns, accepted as Seriphium saxatilis (Levyns) Koekemoer, present
 Stoebe scabra L.f. endemic
 Stoebe schultzii Levyns, endemic
 Stoebe sphaerocephala Schltr. accepted as Stoebe cyathuloides Schltr. present
 Stoebe spiralis Less. accepted as Seriphium spirale (Less.) Koekemoer, present
 Stoebe vulgaris Levyns, accepted as Seriphium plumosum L. present

Stomatanthes 
Genus Stomatanthes:
 Stomatanthes africanus (Oliv. & Hiern) R.M.King & H.Rob. indigenous

Symphyotrichum 
Genus Symphyotrichum:
 Symphyotrichum squamatum (Spreng.) G.L.Nesom, not indigenous
 Symphyotrichum subulatum (Michx.) G.L.Nesom var. squamatum (Spreng.) S.D.Sundb. accepted as Symphyotrichum squamatum (Spreng.) G.L.Nesom, not indigenous

Syncarpha 
Genus Syncarpha:
 Syncarpha affinis (B.Nord.) B.Nord. endemic
 Syncarpha argentea (Thunb.) B.Nord. endemic
 Syncarpha argyropsis (DC.) B.Nord. endemic
 Syncarpha aurea B.Nord. endemic
 Syncarpha canescens (L.) B.Nord. indigenous
 Syncarpha canescens (L.) B.Nord. subsp. canescens, endemic
 Syncarpha canescens (L.) B.Nord. subsp. leucolepis (DC.) B.Nord. endemic
 Syncarpha canescens (L.) B.Nord. subsp. tricolor (DC.) B.Nord. endemic
 Syncarpha chlorochrysum (DC.) B.Nord. endemic
 Syncarpha dregeana (DC.) B.Nord. endemic
 Syncarpha dykei (Bolus) B.Nord. endemic
 Syncarpha eximia (L.) B.Nord. endemic
 Syncarpha ferruginea (Lam.) B.Nord. endemic
 Syncarpha flava (Compton) B.Nord. endemic
 Syncarpha gnaphaloides (L.) DC. endemic
 Syncarpha lepidopodium (Bolus) B.Nord. endemic
 Syncarpha loganiana (Compton) B.Nord. endemic
 Syncarpha marlothii (Schltr.) B.Nord. endemic
 Syncarpha milleflora (L.f.) B.Nord. endemic
 Syncarpha montana (B.Nord.) B.Nord. endemic
 Syncarpha mucronata (P.J.Bergius) B.Nord. endemic
 Syncarpha paniculata (L.) B.Nord. endemic
 Syncarpha recurvata (L.f.) B.Nord. endemic
 Syncarpha sordescens (DC.) B.Nord. endemic
 Syncarpha speciosissima (L.) B.Nord. indigenous
 Syncarpha speciosissima (L.) B.Nord. subsp. angustifolia (DC.) B.Nord. endemic
 Syncarpha speciosissima (L.) B.Nord. subsp. speciosissima, endemic
 Syncarpha staehelina (L.) B.Nord. endemic
 Syncarpha striata (Thunb.) B.Nord. endemic
 Syncarpha variegata (P.J.Bergius) B.Nord. endemic
 Syncarpha vestita (L.) B.Nord. endemic
 Syncarpha virgata (P.J.Bergius) B.Nord. endemic
 Syncarpha zeyheri (Sond.) B.Nord. endemic

Tagetes 
Genus Tagetes:
 Tagetes erecta L. not indigenous
 Tagetes minuta L. not indigenous, invasive

Tanacetum 
Genus Tanacetum:
 Tanacetum cinerariifolium (Trevir.) Sch.Bip. not indigenous
 Tanacetum crithmifolium L. accepted as Hymenolepis crithmifolia (L.) Greuter, M.V.Agab. & Wagenitz, indigenous

Taraxacum 
Genus Taraxacum:
 Taraxacum bessarabicum (Hornem.) Hand.-Mazz. not indigenous
 Taraxacum brachyglossum (Dahlst.) Dahlst. not indigenous
 Taraxacum breviscapum A.J.Richards, not indigenous
 Taraxacum brunneum Soest, not indigenous
 Taraxacum cophocentrum Dahlst. not indigenous
 Taraxacum dilatatum H.Lindb. not indigenous
 Taraxacum disseminatum G.E.Haglund, not indigenous
 Taraxacum duplidens H.Lindb. not indigenous
 Taraxacum ekmanii Dahlst. not indigenous
 Taraxacum hamatiforme Dahlst. not indigenous
 Taraxacum marklundii Palmgr. not indigenous
 Taraxacum officinale Weber, not indigenous
 Taraxacum parvilobum Dahlst. not indigenous
 Taraxacum privum Dahlst. not indigenous
 Taraxacum serotinum (Waldst. & Kit.) Poir. not indigenous

Tarchonanthus 
Genus Tarchonanthus:
 Tarchonanthus camphoratus L. indigenous
 Tarchonanthus littoralis P.P.J.Herman, endemic
 Tarchonanthus minor Less. indigenous
 Tarchonanthus obovatus DC. endemic
 Tarchonanthus parvicapitulatus P.P.J.Herman, indigenous
 Tarchonanthus trilobus DC. indigenous
 Tarchonanthus trilobus DC. var. galpinii (Hutch. & E.Phillips) Paiva, indigenous
 Tarchonanthus trilobus DC. var. trilobus, endemic

Tenrhynea 
Genus Tenrhynea:
 Tenrhynea phylicifolia (DC.) Hilliard & B.L.Burtt, indigenous

Thaminophyllum 
Genus Thaminophyllum:
 Thaminophyllum latifolium Bond, endemic
 Thaminophyllum multiflorum Harv. endemic
 Thaminophyllum mundii Harv. endemic

Tithonia 
Genus Tithonia:
 Tithonia diversifolia (Hemsl.) A.Gray, not indigenous, invasive
 Tithonia rotundifolia (Mill.) S.F.Blake, not indigenous, invasive
 Tithonia tubaeformis (Jacq.) Cass. not indigenous

Tolpis 
Genus Tolpis:
 Tolpis capensis (L.) Sch.Bip. indigenous

Tragopogon 
Genus Tragopogon:
 Tragopogon dubius Scop. not indigenous
 Tragopogon hybridus L. not indigenous
 Tragopogon porrifolius L. not indigenous

Trichogyne 
Genus Trichogyne:
 Trichogyne ambigua (L.) Druce, accepted as Ifloga ambigua (L.) Druce, endemic
 Trichogyne candida (Hilliard) Anderb. accepted as Ifloga candida Hilliard, endemic
 Trichogyne decumbens (Thunb.) Less. accepted as Ifloga decumbens (Thunb.) Schltr. indigenous
 Trichogyne lerouxiae Beyers, accepted as Ifloga lerouxiae (Beyers) N.G.Bergh, endemic
 Trichogyne paronychioides DC. accepted as Ifloga paronychioides (DC.) Fenzl, present
 Trichogyne pilulifera (Schltr.) Anderb. accepted as Ifloga pilulifera Schltr. endemic
 Trichogyne polycnemoides (Fenzl) Anderb. accepted as Ifloga polycnemoides Fenzl, endemic
 Trichogyne repens (L.) Anderb. accepted as Ifloga repens (L.) Hilliard & B.L.Burtt, endemic
 Trichogyne verticillata (L.f.) Less. accepted as Ifloga verticillata (L.f.) Fenzl, endemic

Tridax 
Genus Tridax:
 Tridax procumbens L. not indigenous

Tripteris 
Genus Tripteris:
 Tripteris aghillana DC. accepted as Osteospermum scariosum DC. indigenous
 Tripteris aghillana DC. var. aghillana, accepted as Osteospermum scariosum DC. var. scariosum, indigenous
 Tripteris aghillana DC. var. integrifolia Harv. accepted as Osteospermum scariosum DC. var. integrifolium (Harv.) Norl. endemic
 Tripteris amplectens Harv. accepted as Osteospermum amplectens (Harv.) Norl. endemic
 Tripteris amplexicaulis (Thunb.) Less. accepted as Osteospermum connatum DC. endemic
 Tripteris auriculata S.Moore, accepted as Osteospermum auriculatum (S.Moore) Norl. endemic
 Tripteris breviradiata (Norl.) B.Nord. accepted as Osteospermum breviradiatum Norl. indigenous
 Tripteris calcicola J.C.Manning & Goldblatt, accepted as Osteospermum calcicola (J.C.Manning & Snijman) J.C.Manning & Goldblatt, endemic
 Tripteris clandestina Less. accepted as Osteospermum monstrosum (Burm.f.) J.C.Manning & Goldblatt, indigenous
 Tripteris crassifolia O.Hoffm. accepted as Osteospermum crassifolium (O.Hoffm.) Norl. indigenous
 Tripteris dentata (Burm.f.) Harv. accepted as Osteospermum dentatum Burm.f. endemic
 Tripteris glabra (N.E.Br.) C.A.Sm. accepted as Osteospermum glabrum N.E.Br. endemic
 Tripteris hyoseroides DC. accepted as Osteospermum hyoseroides (DC.) Norl. endemic
 Tripteris linearis Harv. accepted as Osteospermum sinuatum (DC.) Norl. var. lineare (Harv.) Norl. endemic
 Tripteris microcarpa Harv. accepted as Osteospermum microcarpum (Harv.) Norl. indigenous
 Tripteris oppositifolia (Aiton) B.Nord. accepted as Osteospermum oppositifolium (Aiton) Norl. indigenous
 Tripteris pinnatilobata (Norl.) B.Nord. accepted as Osteospermum pinnatilobatum Norl. endemic
 Tripteris polycephala DC. accepted as Osteospermum polycephalum (DC.) Norl. indigenous
 Tripteris rosulata (Norl.) B.Nord. accepted as Osteospermum rosulatum Norl. endemic
 Tripteris sinuata DC. accepted as Osteospermum sinuatum (DC.) Norl. indigenous
 Tripteris sinuata DC. var. linearis (Harv.) B.Nord. accepted as Osteospermum sinuatum (DC.) Norl. var. lineare (Harv.) Norl. endemic
 Tripteris spathulata DC. accepted as Osteospermum spathulatum (DC.) Norl. endemic
 Tripteris spinigera Norl. accepted as Osteospermum spinigerum (Norl.) Norl. endemic
 Tripteris tomentosa (L.f.) Less. accepted as Osteospermum tomentosum (L.f.) Norl. endemic

Troglophyton 
Genus Troglophyton:
 Troglophyton acocksianum Hilliard, endemic
 Troglophyton capillaceum (Thunb.) Hilliard & B.L.Burtt, indigenous
 Troglophyton capillaceum (Thunb.) Hilliard & B.L.Burtt subsp. capillaceum, indigenous
 Troglophyton capillaceum (Thunb.) Hilliard & B.L.Burtt subsp. diffusum (DC.) Hilliard, indigenous
 Troglophyton elsiae Hilliard, endemic
 Troglophyton leptomerum Hilliard, endemic
 Troglophyton parvulum (Harv.) Hilliard & B.L.Burtt, indigenous
 Troglophyton tenellum Hilliard, endemic

Urospermum 
Genus Urospermum:
 Urospermum picroides (L.) Scop. ex F.W.Schmidt, not indigenous

Ursinia 
Genus Ursinia:
 Ursinia abrotanifolia (R.Br.) Spreng. endemic
 Ursinia alpina N.E.Br. endemic
 Ursinia anethoides (DC.) N.E.Br. endemic
 Ursinia anthemoides (L.) Poir. indigenous
 Ursinia anthemoides (L.) Poir. subsp. anthemoides, endemic
 Ursinia anthemoides (L.) Poir. subsp. versicolor (DC.) Prassler, indigenous
 Ursinia arida Magee & Mucina, endemic
 Ursinia brachyloba (Kunze) N.E.Br. endemic
 Ursinia cakilefolia DC. endemic
 Ursinia caledonica (E.Phillips) Prassler, endemic
 Ursinia calenduliflora (DC.) N.E.Br. endemic
 Ursinia chrysanthemoides (Less.) Harv. endemic
 Ursinia coronopifolia (Less.) N.E.Br. endemic
 Ursinia dentata (L.) Poir. endemic
 Ursinia discolor (Less.) N.E.Br. endemic
 Ursinia dregeana (DC.) N.E.Br. endemic
 Ursinia eckloniana (Sond.) N.E.Br. endemic
 Ursinia filipes (E.Mey. ex DC.) N.E.Br. endemic
 Ursinia frutescens Dinter, indigenous
 Ursinia glandulosa Magee & Boatwr. endemic
 Ursinia heterodonta (DC.) N.E.Br. endemic
 Ursinia hispida (DC.) N.E.Br. endemic
 Ursinia kamiesbergensis Magee & Mucina, endemic
 Ursinia laciniata Magee & Mucina, endemic
 Ursinia macropoda (DC.) N.E.Br. endemic
 Ursinia merxmuelleri Prassler, endemic
 Ursinia montana DC. indigenous
 Ursinia montana DC. subsp. apiculata (DC.) Prassler, endemic
 Ursinia montana DC. subsp. montana, indigenous
 Ursinia nana DC. indigenous
 Ursinia nana DC. subsp. leptophylla Prassler, indigenous
 Ursinia nana DC. subsp. nana, indigenous
 Ursinia nudicaulis (Thunb.) N.E.Br. endemic
 Ursinia oreogena Schltr. ex Prassler, endemic
 Ursinia paleacea (L.) Moench, endemic
 Ursinia pilifera (P.J.Bergius) Poir. endemic
 Ursinia pinnata (Thunb.) Prassler, endemic
 Ursinia punctata (Thunb.) N.E.Br. endemic
 Ursinia pygmaea DC. endemic
 Ursinia quinquepartita (DC.) N.E.Br. endemic
 Ursinia rigidula (DC.) N.E.Br. endemic
 Ursinia saxatilis N.E.Br. indigenous
 Ursinia scariosa (Aiton) Poir. indigenous
 Ursinia scariosa (Aiton) Poir. subsp. scariosa, endemic
 Ursinia scariosa (Aiton) Poir. subsp. subhirsuta (DC.) Prassler, endemic
 Ursinia sericea (Thunb.) N.E.Br. endemic
 Ursinia serrata (L.f.) Poir. endemic
 Ursinia speciosa DC. indigenous
 Ursinia subflosculosa (DC.) Prassler, endemic
 Ursinia tenuifolia (L.) Poir. indigenous
 Ursinia tenuifolia (L.) Poir. subsp. ciliaris (DC.) Prassler, endemic
 Ursinia tenuifolia (L.) Poir. subsp. tenuifolia, endemic
 Ursinia tenuiloba DC. indigenous
 Ursinia trifida (Thunb.) N.E.Br. indigenous
 Ursinia trifida (Thunb.) N.E.Br. forma calva Prassler, endemic
 Ursinia trifida (Thunb.) N.E.Br. forma trifida, endemic

Vellereophyton 
Genus Vellereophyton:
 Vellereophyton dealbatum (Thunb.) Hilliard & B.L.Burtt, indigenous
 Vellereophyton felinum Hilliard, endemic
 Vellereophyton gracillimum Hilliard, endemic
 Vellereophyton lasianthum (Schltr. & Moeser) Hilliard, endemic
 Vellereophyton niveum Hilliard, endemic
 Vellereophyton pulvinatum Hilliard, endemic
 Vellereophyton vellereum (R.A.Dyer) Hilliard, endemic

Verbesina 
Genus Verbesina:
 Verbesina encelioides (Cav.) Benth. & Hook.f. ex A.Gray subsp. encelioides, not indigenous
 Verbesina encelioides (Cav.) Benth. & Hook.f. ex A.Gray subsp. exauriculata (B.L.Rob. & Greenm.), not indigenous
 Verbesina encelioides (Cav.) Benth. & Hook.f. ex A.Gray var. exauriculata B.L.Rob. & Greenm. accepted as Verbesina encelioides (Cav.) Benth. & Hook.f. ex A.Gray subsp. exauriculata (B.L.Rob. & Greenm.), not indigenous

Vernonella 
Genus Vernonella:
 Vernonella africana Sond. endemic

Vernonia 
Genus Vernonia:
 Vernonia acuminatissima S.Moore, accepted as Vernoniastrum acuminatissimum (S.Moore) H.Rob. Skvarla & V.A.Funk, indigenous
 Vernonia adoensis Sch.Bip. ex Walp. accepted as Baccharoides adoensis (Sch.Bip. ex Walp.) H.Rob. indigenous
 Vernonia adoensis Sch.Bip. ex Walp. var. kotschyana (Sch.Bip. ex Walp.) G.V.Pope, accepted as Baccharoides adoensis (Sch.Bip. ex Walp.) H.Rob. indigenous
 Vernonia adoensis Sch.Bip. ex Walp. var. mossambiquensis (Steetz) G.V.Pope, accepted as Baccharoides adoensis (Sch.Bip. ex Walp.) H.Rob. indigenous
 Vernonia africana (Sond.) Druce, accepted as Vernonella africana Sond. endemic
 Vernonia amygdalina Delile, accepted as Gymnanthemum amygdalinum (Delile) Sch.Bip. ex Walp. indigenous
 Vernonia angulifolia DC. accepted as Distephanus angulifolius (DC.) H.Rob. & B.Kahn, indigenous
 Vernonia anisochaetoides Sond. accepted as Distephanus anisochaetoides (Sond.) H.Rob. & B.Kahn, indigenous
 Vernonia aristata (DC.) Sch.Bip. accepted as Hilliardiella aristata (DC.) H.Rob. indigenous
 Vernonia aurantiaca (O.Hoffm.) N.E.Br. accepted as Distephanus divaricatus (Steetz) H.Rob. & B.Kahn, indigenous
 Vernonia bainesii Oliv. & Hiern sens.lat. accepted as Polydora bainesii (Oliv. & Hiern) H.Rob. indigenous
 Vernonia bequaertii De Wild. accepted as Baccharoides adoensis (Sch.Bip. ex Walp.) H.Rob.
 Vernonia capensis (Houtt.) Druce, accepted as Hilliardiella capensis (Houtt.) H.Rob. Skvarla & V.A.Funk, indigenous
 Vernonia centaureoides Klatt, accepted as Oocephala centaureoides (Klatt) H.Rob. & Skvarla, indigenous
 Vernonia cinerascens Sch.Bip. accepted as Orbivestus cinerascens (Sch.Bip.) H.Rob. indigenous
 Vernonia cinerea (L.) Less. accepted as Cyanthillium cinereum (L.) H.Rob. not indigenous
 Vernonia collina Schltr. accepted as Pseudopegolettia thodei (E.Phillips) H.Rob. Skvarla & V.A.Funk, indigenous
 Vernonia colorata (Willd.) Drake, accepted as Gymnanthemum coloratum (Willd.) H.Rob. & B.Kahn, indigenous
 Vernonia corymbosa (L.f.) Less. accepted as Gymnanthemum corymbosum (L.f.) H.Rob. indigenous
 Vernonia corymbosa (L.f.) Less. var. mespiloides DC. accepted as Gymnanthemum corymbosum (L.f.) H.Rob. indigenous
 Vernonia corymbosa (L.f.) Less. var. pleiantha O.Hoffm. accepted as Gymnanthemum corymbosum (L.f.) H.Rob. indigenous
 Vernonia crataegifolia Hutch. accepted as Gymnanthemum crataegifolium (Hutch.) H.Rob. indigenous
 Vernonia dregeana Sch.Bip. accepted as Hilliardiella nudicaulis (DC.) H.Rob. endemic
 Vernonia erinacea Wild, accepted as Polydora angustifolia (Steetz) H.Rob. indigenous
 Vernonia fastigiata Oliv. & Hiern, accepted as Parapolydora fastigiata (Oliv. & Hiern) H.Rob. indigenous
 Vernonia flanaganii (E.Phillips) Hilliard, accepted as Hilliardiella flanaganii (E.Phillips) H.Rob. Skvarla & V.A.Funk, endemic
 Vernonia fulviseta S.Moore, accepted as Baccharoides adoensis (Sch.Bip. ex Walp.) H.Rob.
 Vernonia galpinii Klatt, accepted as Pseudopegolettia tenella (DC.) H.Rob. Skvarla & V.A.Funk, indigenous
 Vernonia gerberiformis Oliv. & Hiern subsp. macrocyanus (O.Hoffm.) C.Jeffrey, accepted as Linzia gerberiformis (Oliv. & Hiern) H.Rob. indigenous
 Vernonia gerberiformis Oliv. & Hiern var. hockii (De Wild. & Muschl.) G.V.Pope, accepted as Linzia gerberiformis (Oliv. & Hiern) H.Rob. indigenous
 Vernonia gerrardii Harv. accepted as Parapolydora gerrardii (Harv.) H.Rob. Skvarla & V.A.Funk, endemic
 Vernonia glabra (Steetz) Vatke, accepted as Linzia glabra Steetz, indigenous
 Vernonia glabra (Steetz) Vatke var. laxa (Steetz) Brenan, accepted as Linzia glabra Steetz, indigenous
 Vernonia grantii Oliv. accepted as Baccharoides adoensis (Sch.Bip. ex Walp.) H.Rob.
 Vernonia hirsuta (DC.) Sch.Bip. ex Walp. accepted as Hilliardiella hirsuta (DC.) H.Rob. indigenous
 Vernonia hirsuta (DC.) Sch.Bip. ex Walp. var. flanaganii E.Phillips, accepted as Hilliardiella flanaganii (E.Phillips) H.Rob. Skvarla & V.A.Funk, indigenous
 Vernonia hirsuta (DC.) Sch.Bip. ex Walp. var. obtusifolia Harv. accepted as Hilliardiella hirsuta (DC.) H.Rob. indigenous
 Vernonia hockii De Wild. & Muschl. accepted as Linzia gerberiformis (Oliv. & Hiern) H.Rob. indigenous
 Vernonia inhacensis G.V.Pope, accepted as Distephanus inhacensis (G.V.Pope) Boon & Glen, indigenous
 Vernonia integra S.Moore, accepted as Baccharoides adoensis (Sch.Bip. ex Walp.) H.Rob.
 Vernonia kotschyana Sch.Bip. ex Walp. accepted as Baccharoides adoensis (Sch.Bip. ex Walp.) H.Rob. indigenous
 Vernonia kraussii Sch.Bip. ex Walp. accepted as Hilliardiella elaeagnoides (DC.) Swelank. & J.C.Manning, indigenous
 Vernonia kraussii Sch.Bip. ex Walp. var. oligocephala (DC.) H.Rob. accepted as Hilliardiella elaeagnoides (DC.) Swelank. & J.C.Manning, indigenous
 Vernonia latisquama Mattf. accepted as Baccharoides adoensis (Sch.Bip. ex Walp.) H.Rob.
 Vernonia leptolepis Baker, accepted as Baccharoides adoensis (Sch.Bip. ex Walp.) H.Rob.
 Vernonia macrocephala A.Rich. accepted as Baccharoides adoensis (Sch.Bip. ex Walp.) H.Rob.
 Vernonia macrocyanus O.Hoffm. accepted as Linzia gerberiformis (Oliv. & Hiern) H.Rob. indigenous
 Vernonia meiostephana C.Jeffrey, accepted as Cyanthillium vernonioides (Muschl.) H.Rob. indigenous
 Vernonia melleri Oliv. & Hiern sens.lat. accepted as Linzia melleri (Oliv. & Hiern) H.Rob. sens.lat.
 Vernonia mespilifolia Less. accepted as Gymnanthemum capensis (A.Spreng.) J.C.Manning & Swelank. indigenous
 Vernonia mespilifolia Less. var. subcanescens DC. accepted as Gymnanthemum crataegifolium (Hutch.) H.Rob. indigenous
 Vernonia misera Oliv. & Hiern, accepted as Erlangea misera (Oliv. & Hiern) S.Moore, indigenous
 Vernonia monocephala Harv. accepted as Pseudopegolettia tenella (DC.) H.Rob. Skvarla & V.A.Funk, indigenous
 Vernonia mossambiquensis (Steetz) Oliv. & Hiern, accepted as Baccharoides adoensis (Sch.Bip. ex Walp.) H.Rob. indigenous
 Vernonia myriantha Hook.f. accepted as Gymnanthemum myrianthum (Hook.f.) H.Rob. indigenous
 Vernonia natalensis Sch.Bip. ex Walp. accepted as Hilliardiella aristata (DC.) H.Rob. indigenous
 Vernonia neocorymbosa Hilliard, accepted as Gymnanthemum corymbosum (L.f.) H.Rob. indigenous
 Vernonia nestor S.Moore, accepted as Vernoniastrum nestor (S.Moore) H.Rob. indigenous
 Vernonia obionifolia O.Hoffm. accepted as Namibithamnus obionifolius (O.Hoffm.) H.Rob. Skvarla & V.A.Funk, indigenous
 Vernonia oligocephala (DC.) Sch.Bip. ex Walp. accepted as Hilliardiella elaeagnoides (DC.) Swelank. & J.C.Manning, indigenous
 Vernonia pinifolia (Lam.) Less. accepted as Hilliardiella capensis (Houtt.) H.Rob. Skvarla & V.A.Funk, indigenous
 Vernonia pinifolia (Lam.) Less. var. glabrata Harv. accepted as Hilliardiella capensis (Houtt.) H.Rob. Skvarla & V.A.Funk, indigenous
 Vernonia polymorpha Vatke var. accedens Vatke, accepted as Baccharoides adoensis (Sch.Bip. ex Walp.) H.Rob.
 Vernonia polymorpha Vatke var. adoensis (Sch.Bip. ex Walp.) Vatke, accepted as Baccharoides adoensis (Sch.Bip. ex Walp.) H.Rob. indigenous
 Vernonia polymorpha Vatke var. ambigua Vatke, accepted as Baccharoides adoensis (Sch.Bip. ex Walp.) H.Rob.
 Vernonia poskeana Vatke & Hildebr. subsp. botswanica G.V.Pope, accepted as Polydora poskeana (Vatke & Hildebr.) H.Rob. indigenous
 Vernonia pseudocorymbosa Thell. accepted as Gymnanthemum crataegifolium (Hutch.) H.Rob. indigenous
 Vernonia pseudonatalensis Wild, accepted as Hilliardiella aristata (DC.) H.Rob. indigenous
 Vernonia rhodanthoidea Muschl. accepted as Polydora angustifolia (Steetz) H.Rob. indigenous
 Vernonia rogersii S.Moore, accepted as Vernoniastrum acuminatissimum (S.Moore) H.Rob. Skvarla & V.A.Funk, indigenous
 Vernonia schlechteri O.Hoffm. accepted as Oocephala centaureoides (Klatt) H.Rob. & Skvarla, indigenous
 Vernonia shirensis Oliv. & Hiern, accepted as Baccharoides adoensis (Sch.Bip. ex Walp.) H.Rob.
 Vernonia staehelinoides Harv. accepted as Oocephala staehelinoides (Harv.) H.Rob. & Skvarla, endemic
 Vernonia steetziana Oliv. & Hiern, accepted as Polydora steetziana (Oliv. & Hiern) H.Rob. indigenous
 Vernonia stenostegia (Stapf) Hutch. & Dalziel, accepted as Baccharoides adoensis (Sch.Bip. ex Walp.) H.Rob.
 Vernonia stipulacea Klatt, accepted as Gymnanthemum myrianthum (Hook.f.) H.Rob. indigenous
 Vernonia sutherlandii Harv. accepted as Hilliardiella sutherlandii (Harv.) H.Rob. indigenous
 Vernonia theophrastifolia Schweinf. ex Oliv. & Hiern, accepted as Gymnanthemum theophrastifolium (Schweinf. ex Oliv. & Hiern) H.Rob. indigenous
 Vernonia thodei E.Phillips, accepted as Pseudopegolettia thodei (E.Phillips) H.Rob. Skvarla & V.A.Funk, endemic
 Vernonia tigna Klatt, accepted as Gymnanthemum corymbosum (L.f.) H.Rob. indigenous
 Vernonia tigrensis Oliv. & Hiern, accepted as Baccharoides adoensis (Sch.Bip. ex Walp.) H.Rob.
 Vernonia transvaalensis Hutch. accepted as Cyanthillium wollastonii (S.Moore) H.Rob. Skvarla & V.A.Funk, indigenous
 Vernonia triflora Bremek. accepted as Gymnanthemum triflorum (Bremek.) H.Rob. endemic
 Vernonia umbratica Oberm. accepted as Cyanthillium wollastonii (S.Moore) H.Rob. Skvarla & V.A.Funk, indigenous
 Vernonia vernonella Harv. accepted as Vernonella africana Sond. indigenous
 Vernonia whyteana Britten, accepted as Baccharoides adoensis (Sch.Bip. ex Walp.) H.Rob.
 Vernonia wollastonii S.Moore, accepted as Cyanthillium wollastonii (S.Moore) H.Rob. Skvarla & V.A.Funk, indigenous
 Vernonia woodii O.Hoffm. accepted as Baccharoides adoensis (Sch.Bip. ex Walp.) H.Rob.

Vernoniastrum 
Genus Vernoniastrum:
 Vernoniastrum acuminatissimum (S.Moore) H.Rob. Skvarla & V.A.Funk, indigenous
 Vernoniastrum nestor (S.Moore) H.Rob. indigenous

Vicoa 
Genus Vicoa:
 Vicoa auriculata Cass. was accepted as Pentanema indicum (L.) Y.Ling, not indigenous

Waitzia 
Genus Waitzia:
 Waitzia refracta (Jacq.) Heynh. accepted as Freesia refracta (Jacq.) Klatt
 Waitzia xanthospila (DC.) Heynh. accepted as Freesia caryophyllacea (Burm.f.) N.E.Br.

Webbia 
Genus Webbia:
 Webbia aristata DC. accepted as Hilliardiella aristata (DC.) H.Rob. indigenous
 Webbia elaeagnoides DC. accepted as Hilliardiella elaeagnoides (DC.) Swelank. & J.C.Manning, indigenous
 Webbia hirsuta DC. accepted as Hilliardiella hirsuta (DC.) H.Rob. indigenous
 Webbia kraussii Sch.Bip. accepted as Conyza obscura DC. indigenous
 Webbia nudicaulis DC. accepted as Hilliardiella nudicaulis (DC.) H.Rob. endemic
 Webbia oligocephala DC. accepted as Hilliardiella elaeagnoides (DC.) Swelank. & J.C.Manning, indigenous
 Webbia pinifolia (Lam.) DC. accepted as Hilliardiella capensis (Houtt.) H.Rob. Skvarla & V.A.Funk, indigenous

Wedelia 
Genus Wedelia:
 Wedelia glauca (Ortega) Hoffm. ex Hicken, not indigenous

Xanthium 
Genus Xanthium:
 Xanthium spinosum L. not indigenous, invasive
 Xanthium strumarium L. not indigenous, invasive

Xenismia 
Genus Xenismia:
 Xenismia acanthosperma DC. accepted as Osteospermum acanthospermum (DC.) Norl. indigenous

Xeranthemum 
Genus Xeranthemum:
 Xeranthemum ericoides Lam. accepted as Dolichothrix ericoides (Lam.) Hilliard & B.L.Burtt, indigenous

Youngia 
Genus Youngia:
 Youngia japonica (L.) DC. not indigenous

Zinnia 
Genus Zinnia:
 Zinnia peruviana (L.) L. not indigenous

Zoutpansbergia 
Genus Zoutpansbergia:
 Zoutpansbergia caerulea Hutch. endemic

Zyrphelis 
Genus Zyrphelis:
 Zyrphelis burchellii (DC.) Kuntze, accepted as Mairia burchellii DC. endemic
 Zyrphelis capensis Zinnecker, indigenous
 Zyrphelis decumbens (Schltr.) G.L.Nesom, endemic
 Zyrphelis ecklonis (DC.) Kuntze, indigenous
 Zyrphelis ecklonis (DC.) Kuntze subsp. ecklonis, endemic
 Zyrphelis foliosa (Harv.) Kuntze, endemic
 Zyrphelis glabra Zinnecker, indigenous
 Zyrphelis glandulosa Zinnecker, indigenous
 Zyrphelis grauii Zinnecker, indigenous
 Zyrphelis hirsuta (DC.) Kuntze, accepted as Mairia purpurata (L.) Goldblatt & J.C.Manning, indigenous
 Zyrphelis lasiocarpa (DC.) Kuntze, endemic
 Zyrphelis macrocarpa Zinnecker, indigenous
 Zyrphelis microcephala (Less.) Nees, indigenous
 Zyrphelis microcephala (Less.) Nees subsp. microcephala, endemic
 Zyrphelis montana (Schltr.) G.L.Nesom, endemic
 Zyrphelis nervosa Zinnecker, indigenous
 Zyrphelis perezioides (Less.) G.L.Nesom, accepted as Zyrphelis pilosella (Thunb.) Kuntze, endemic
 Zyrphelis spathulata Zinnecker, indigenous
 Zyrphelis taxifolia (L.) Nees, endemic

References

South African plant biodiversity lists
Asteraceae